

270001–270100 

|-bgcolor=#E9E9E9
| 270001 || 2001 AH || — || January 1, 2001 || Kitt Peak || Spacewatch || — || align=right | 3.3 km || 
|-id=002 bgcolor=#d6d6d6
| 270002 ||  || — || January 2, 2001 || Socorro || LINEAR || — || align=right | 3.5 km || 
|-id=003 bgcolor=#E9E9E9
| 270003 ||  || — || January 4, 2001 || Socorro || LINEAR || — || align=right | 3.1 km || 
|-id=004 bgcolor=#fefefe
| 270004 ||  || — || January 20, 2001 || Socorro || LINEAR || — || align=right | 1.2 km || 
|-id=005 bgcolor=#d6d6d6
| 270005 ||  || — || January 19, 2001 || Socorro || LINEAR || — || align=right | 3.1 km || 
|-id=006 bgcolor=#d6d6d6
| 270006 ||  || — || January 26, 2001 || Socorro || LINEAR || — || align=right | 4.2 km || 
|-id=007 bgcolor=#fefefe
| 270007 ||  || — || February 16, 2001 || Socorro || LINEAR || — || align=right | 1.1 km || 
|-id=008 bgcolor=#E9E9E9
| 270008 ||  || — || February 19, 2001 || Socorro || LINEAR || — || align=right | 3.0 km || 
|-id=009 bgcolor=#d6d6d6
| 270009 ||  || — || February 21, 2001 || Kitt Peak || Spacewatch || — || align=right | 2.7 km || 
|-id=010 bgcolor=#d6d6d6
| 270010 ||  || — || February 19, 2001 || Socorro || LINEAR || — || align=right | 4.5 km || 
|-id=011 bgcolor=#d6d6d6
| 270011 ||  || — || February 20, 2001 || Socorro || LINEAR || — || align=right | 3.2 km || 
|-id=012 bgcolor=#fefefe
| 270012 ||  || — || February 19, 2001 || Anderson Mesa || LONEOS || — || align=right | 1.2 km || 
|-id=013 bgcolor=#d6d6d6
| 270013 ||  || — || March 3, 2001 || Socorro || LINEAR || — || align=right | 4.4 km || 
|-id=014 bgcolor=#d6d6d6
| 270014 ||  || — || March 14, 2001 || Kitt Peak || Spacewatch || KOR || align=right | 2.0 km || 
|-id=015 bgcolor=#fefefe
| 270015 ||  || — || March 21, 2001 || Anderson Mesa || LONEOS || — || align=right | 1.0 km || 
|-id=016 bgcolor=#fefefe
| 270016 ||  || — || March 18, 2001 || Socorro || LINEAR || PHO || align=right | 1.2 km || 
|-id=017 bgcolor=#fefefe
| 270017 ||  || — || March 26, 2001 || Kitt Peak || Spacewatch || — || align=right data-sort-value="0.79" | 790 m || 
|-id=018 bgcolor=#d6d6d6
| 270018 ||  || — || March 26, 2001 || Kitt Peak || Spacewatch || KOR || align=right | 1.7 km || 
|-id=019 bgcolor=#fefefe
| 270019 ||  || — || March 26, 2001 || Cerro Tololo || DLS || — || align=right data-sort-value="0.94" | 940 m || 
|-id=020 bgcolor=#fefefe
| 270020 ||  || — || March 26, 2001 || Socorro || LINEAR || — || align=right | 1.1 km || 
|-id=021 bgcolor=#d6d6d6
| 270021 ||  || — || March 27, 2001 || Kitt Peak || Spacewatch || EOS || align=right | 2.6 km || 
|-id=022 bgcolor=#d6d6d6
| 270022 ||  || — || March 21, 2001 || Kitt Peak || Spacewatch || KOR || align=right | 1.8 km || 
|-id=023 bgcolor=#d6d6d6
| 270023 ||  || — || March 20, 2001 || Kitt Peak || Spacewatch || FIR || align=right | 3.3 km || 
|-id=024 bgcolor=#fefefe
| 270024 ||  || — || April 24, 2001 || Kitt Peak || Spacewatch || FLO || align=right data-sort-value="0.99" | 990 m || 
|-id=025 bgcolor=#d6d6d6
| 270025 ||  || — || April 23, 2001 || Socorro || LINEAR || — || align=right | 2.0 km || 
|-id=026 bgcolor=#d6d6d6
| 270026 ||  || — || April 18, 2001 || Kitt Peak || Spacewatch || — || align=right | 5.4 km || 
|-id=027 bgcolor=#fefefe
| 270027 || 2001 JS || — || May 10, 2001 || Ondřejov || L. Kotková || — || align=right data-sort-value="0.85" | 850 m || 
|-id=028 bgcolor=#d6d6d6
| 270028 ||  || — || May 15, 2001 || Anderson Mesa || LONEOS || — || align=right | 4.2 km || 
|-id=029 bgcolor=#fefefe
| 270029 ||  || — || May 15, 2001 || Anderson Mesa || LONEOS || — || align=right data-sort-value="0.93" | 930 m || 
|-id=030 bgcolor=#fefefe
| 270030 ||  || — || May 17, 2001 || Socorro || LINEAR || — || align=right | 1.7 km || 
|-id=031 bgcolor=#fefefe
| 270031 ||  || — || May 17, 2001 || Socorro || LINEAR || — || align=right | 1.4 km || 
|-id=032 bgcolor=#fefefe
| 270032 ||  || — || May 22, 2001 || Socorro || LINEAR || — || align=right | 1.8 km || 
|-id=033 bgcolor=#d6d6d6
| 270033 ||  || — || May 21, 2001 || Socorro || LINEAR || — || align=right | 4.4 km || 
|-id=034 bgcolor=#d6d6d6
| 270034 ||  || — || May 22, 2001 || Socorro || LINEAR || Tj (2.94) || align=right | 4.7 km || 
|-id=035 bgcolor=#d6d6d6
| 270035 ||  || — || May 22, 2001 || Bergisch Gladbach || W. Bickel || — || align=right | 3.2 km || 
|-id=036 bgcolor=#fefefe
| 270036 ||  || — || May 24, 2001 || Prescott || P. G. Comba || V || align=right data-sort-value="0.90" | 900 m || 
|-id=037 bgcolor=#FA8072
| 270037 ||  || — || May 25, 2001 || Socorro || LINEAR || — || align=right | 1.1 km || 
|-id=038 bgcolor=#FA8072
| 270038 ||  || — || May 22, 2001 || Anderson Mesa || LONEOS || — || align=right | 1.7 km || 
|-id=039 bgcolor=#fefefe
| 270039 ||  || — || May 25, 2001 || Kitt Peak || Spacewatch || — || align=right data-sort-value="0.98" | 980 m || 
|-id=040 bgcolor=#E9E9E9
| 270040 ||  || — || June 15, 2001 || Socorro || LINEAR || — || align=right | 2.6 km || 
|-id=041 bgcolor=#d6d6d6
| 270041 ||  || — || June 15, 2001 || Palomar || NEAT || — || align=right | 4.4 km || 
|-id=042 bgcolor=#fefefe
| 270042 ||  || — || June 15, 2001 || Palomar || NEAT || — || align=right | 1.4 km || 
|-id=043 bgcolor=#fefefe
| 270043 ||  || — || June 19, 2001 || Socorro || LINEAR || — || align=right | 2.0 km || 
|-id=044 bgcolor=#FA8072
| 270044 ||  || — || June 20, 2001 || Anderson Mesa || LONEOS || — || align=right | 1.3 km || 
|-id=045 bgcolor=#fefefe
| 270045 ||  || — || June 27, 2001 || Palomar || NEAT || — || align=right data-sort-value="0.98" | 980 m || 
|-id=046 bgcolor=#fefefe
| 270046 ||  || — || June 27, 2001 || Palomar || NEAT || — || align=right data-sort-value="0.84" | 840 m || 
|-id=047 bgcolor=#fefefe
| 270047 ||  || — || June 28, 2001 || Palomar || NEAT || V || align=right data-sort-value="0.80" | 800 m || 
|-id=048 bgcolor=#fefefe
| 270048 ||  || — || June 19, 2001 || Palomar || NEAT || FLO || align=right | 1.2 km || 
|-id=049 bgcolor=#d6d6d6
| 270049 ||  || — || July 12, 2001 || Palomar || NEAT || URS || align=right | 4.6 km || 
|-id=050 bgcolor=#fefefe
| 270050 ||  || — || July 18, 2001 || Palomar || NEAT || H || align=right | 1.0 km || 
|-id=051 bgcolor=#fefefe
| 270051 ||  || — || July 20, 2001 || Palomar || NEAT || — || align=right data-sort-value="0.98" | 980 m || 
|-id=052 bgcolor=#fefefe
| 270052 ||  || — || July 21, 2001 || Palomar || NEAT || — || align=right | 1.2 km || 
|-id=053 bgcolor=#fefefe
| 270053 ||  || — || July 19, 2001 || Palomar || NEAT || V || align=right data-sort-value="0.97" | 970 m || 
|-id=054 bgcolor=#d6d6d6
| 270054 ||  || — || July 20, 2001 || Palomar || NEAT || — || align=right | 5.2 km || 
|-id=055 bgcolor=#E9E9E9
| 270055 ||  || — || July 20, 2001 || Palomar || NEAT || — || align=right | 1.2 km || 
|-id=056 bgcolor=#fefefe
| 270056 ||  || — || July 21, 2001 || Palomar || NEAT || V || align=right data-sort-value="0.95" | 950 m || 
|-id=057 bgcolor=#fefefe
| 270057 ||  || — || July 21, 2001 || Palomar || NEAT || H || align=right data-sort-value="0.80" | 800 m || 
|-id=058 bgcolor=#E9E9E9
| 270058 ||  || — || July 22, 2001 || Palomar || NEAT || — || align=right | 1.3 km || 
|-id=059 bgcolor=#fefefe
| 270059 ||  || — || July 27, 2001 || Haleakala || NEAT || NYS || align=right data-sort-value="0.71" | 710 m || 
|-id=060 bgcolor=#fefefe
| 270060 ||  || — || July 26, 2001 || Palomar || NEAT || PHO || align=right | 1.3 km || 
|-id=061 bgcolor=#fefefe
| 270061 ||  || — || July 27, 2001 || Palomar || NEAT || — || align=right | 1.0 km || 
|-id=062 bgcolor=#fefefe
| 270062 ||  || — || July 29, 2001 || Palomar || NEAT || — || align=right | 1.2 km || 
|-id=063 bgcolor=#fefefe
| 270063 ||  || — || July 23, 2001 || Haleakala || NEAT || — || align=right data-sort-value="0.97" | 970 m || 
|-id=064 bgcolor=#fefefe
| 270064 ||  || — || July 25, 2001 || Haleakala || NEAT || SVE || align=right | 2.9 km || 
|-id=065 bgcolor=#d6d6d6
| 270065 ||  || — || July 29, 2001 || Palomar || NEAT || — || align=right | 4.0 km || 
|-id=066 bgcolor=#fefefe
| 270066 ||  || — || July 22, 2001 || Palomar || NEAT || FLO || align=right | 1.1 km || 
|-id=067 bgcolor=#fefefe
| 270067 ||  || — || August 14, 2001 || Ondřejov || P. Kušnirák || FLO || align=right data-sort-value="0.85" | 850 m || 
|-id=068 bgcolor=#fefefe
| 270068 ||  || — || August 9, 2001 || Palomar || NEAT || FLO || align=right data-sort-value="0.92" | 920 m || 
|-id=069 bgcolor=#E9E9E9
| 270069 ||  || — || August 11, 2001 || Haleakala || NEAT || — || align=right | 1.4 km || 
|-id=070 bgcolor=#d6d6d6
| 270070 ||  || — || August 10, 2001 || Palomar || NEAT || — || align=right | 5.5 km || 
|-id=071 bgcolor=#fefefe
| 270071 ||  || — || August 15, 2001 || Haleakala || NEAT || — || align=right data-sort-value="0.74" | 740 m || 
|-id=072 bgcolor=#fefefe
| 270072 ||  || — || August 13, 2001 || Haleakala || NEAT || — || align=right | 1.1 km || 
|-id=073 bgcolor=#FA8072
| 270073 ||  || — || August 14, 2001 || Palomar || NEAT || — || align=right data-sort-value="0.68" | 680 m || 
|-id=074 bgcolor=#fefefe
| 270074 ||  || — || August 15, 2001 || Haleakala || NEAT || — || align=right | 1.5 km || 
|-id=075 bgcolor=#fefefe
| 270075 ||  || — || August 14, 2001 || Haleakala || NEAT || — || align=right | 1.1 km || 
|-id=076 bgcolor=#fefefe
| 270076 ||  || — || August 14, 2001 || Haleakala || NEAT || NYS || align=right data-sort-value="0.66" | 660 m || 
|-id=077 bgcolor=#fefefe
| 270077 ||  || — || August 16, 2001 || Socorro || LINEAR || V || align=right data-sort-value="0.85" | 850 m || 
|-id=078 bgcolor=#fefefe
| 270078 ||  || — || August 16, 2001 || Socorro || LINEAR || NYS || align=right | 1.1 km || 
|-id=079 bgcolor=#d6d6d6
| 270079 ||  || — || August 16, 2001 || Socorro || LINEAR || EUP || align=right | 6.4 km || 
|-id=080 bgcolor=#fefefe
| 270080 ||  || — || August 16, 2001 || Socorro || LINEAR || V || align=right | 1.2 km || 
|-id=081 bgcolor=#d6d6d6
| 270081 ||  || — || August 16, 2001 || Socorro || LINEAR || 637 || align=right | 3.8 km || 
|-id=082 bgcolor=#fefefe
| 270082 ||  || — || August 16, 2001 || Socorro || LINEAR || NYS || align=right data-sort-value="0.94" | 940 m || 
|-id=083 bgcolor=#d6d6d6
| 270083 ||  || — || August 16, 2001 || Socorro || LINEAR || — || align=right | 4.5 km || 
|-id=084 bgcolor=#fefefe
| 270084 ||  || — || August 22, 2001 || Socorro || LINEAR || PHO || align=right | 1.7 km || 
|-id=085 bgcolor=#FA8072
| 270085 ||  || — || August 20, 2001 || Socorro || LINEAR || — || align=right | 1.8 km || 
|-id=086 bgcolor=#fefefe
| 270086 ||  || — || August 25, 2001 || Socorro || LINEAR || — || align=right | 1.5 km || 
|-id=087 bgcolor=#fefefe
| 270087 ||  || — || August 19, 2001 || Socorro || LINEAR || NYS || align=right data-sort-value="0.82" | 820 m || 
|-id=088 bgcolor=#fefefe
| 270088 ||  || — || August 20, 2001 || Socorro || LINEAR || — || align=right data-sort-value="0.83" | 830 m || 
|-id=089 bgcolor=#fefefe
| 270089 ||  || — || August 22, 2001 || Socorro || LINEAR || PHO || align=right | 1.2 km || 
|-id=090 bgcolor=#E9E9E9
| 270090 ||  || — || August 23, 2001 || Anderson Mesa || LONEOS || — || align=right | 1.0 km || 
|-id=091 bgcolor=#fefefe
| 270091 ||  || — || August 22, 2001 || Haleakala || NEAT || MAS || align=right data-sort-value="0.90" | 900 m || 
|-id=092 bgcolor=#fefefe
| 270092 ||  || — || August 23, 2001 || Anderson Mesa || LONEOS || H || align=right data-sort-value="0.72" | 720 m || 
|-id=093 bgcolor=#fefefe
| 270093 ||  || — || August 23, 2001 || Anderson Mesa || LONEOS || V || align=right | 1.2 km || 
|-id=094 bgcolor=#fefefe
| 270094 ||  || — || August 24, 2001 || Socorro || LINEAR || NYS || align=right | 1.1 km || 
|-id=095 bgcolor=#d6d6d6
| 270095 ||  || — || August 24, 2001 || Anderson Mesa || LONEOS || — || align=right | 4.9 km || 
|-id=096 bgcolor=#fefefe
| 270096 ||  || — || August 24, 2001 || Anderson Mesa || LONEOS || V || align=right data-sort-value="0.95" | 950 m || 
|-id=097 bgcolor=#fefefe
| 270097 ||  || — || August 24, 2001 || Socorro || LINEAR || — || align=right | 1.4 km || 
|-id=098 bgcolor=#d6d6d6
| 270098 ||  || — || August 25, 2001 || Socorro || LINEAR || TIR || align=right | 3.5 km || 
|-id=099 bgcolor=#fefefe
| 270099 ||  || — || August 25, 2001 || Socorro || LINEAR || V || align=right | 1.1 km || 
|-id=100 bgcolor=#d6d6d6
| 270100 ||  || — || August 25, 2001 || Socorro || LINEAR || URS || align=right | 5.7 km || 
|}

270101–270200 

|-bgcolor=#fefefe
| 270101 ||  || — || August 20, 2001 || Socorro || LINEAR || — || align=right | 1.1 km || 
|-id=102 bgcolor=#fefefe
| 270102 ||  || — || August 19, 2001 || Socorro || LINEAR || V || align=right | 1.00 km || 
|-id=103 bgcolor=#fefefe
| 270103 ||  || — || August 31, 2001 || Palomar || NEAT || — || align=right | 1.4 km || 
|-id=104 bgcolor=#fefefe
| 270104 ||  || — || August 24, 2001 || Anderson Mesa || LONEOS || — || align=right | 1.0 km || 
|-id=105 bgcolor=#fefefe
| 270105 ||  || — || August 23, 2001 || Anderson Mesa || LONEOS || — || align=right | 1.2 km || 
|-id=106 bgcolor=#d6d6d6
| 270106 ||  || — || August 27, 2001 || Palomar || NEAT || — || align=right | 4.0 km || 
|-id=107 bgcolor=#fefefe
| 270107 ||  || — || September 7, 2001 || Socorro || LINEAR || MAS || align=right data-sort-value="0.90" | 900 m || 
|-id=108 bgcolor=#fefefe
| 270108 ||  || — || September 8, 2001 || Socorro || LINEAR || V || align=right | 1.2 km || 
|-id=109 bgcolor=#fefefe
| 270109 ||  || — || September 8, 2001 || Socorro || LINEAR || — || align=right | 1.6 km || 
|-id=110 bgcolor=#fefefe
| 270110 ||  || — || September 7, 2001 || Socorro || LINEAR || V || align=right data-sort-value="0.88" | 880 m || 
|-id=111 bgcolor=#fefefe
| 270111 ||  || — || September 7, 2001 || Socorro || LINEAR || NYS || align=right | 1.0 km || 
|-id=112 bgcolor=#fefefe
| 270112 ||  || — || September 7, 2001 || Socorro || LINEAR || NYS || align=right data-sort-value="0.86" | 860 m || 
|-id=113 bgcolor=#d6d6d6
| 270113 ||  || — || September 7, 2001 || Socorro || LINEAR || — || align=right | 4.9 km || 
|-id=114 bgcolor=#fefefe
| 270114 ||  || — || September 7, 2001 || Socorro || LINEAR || NYS || align=right data-sort-value="0.88" | 880 m || 
|-id=115 bgcolor=#fefefe
| 270115 ||  || — || September 10, 2001 || Desert Eagle || W. K. Y. Yeung || V || align=right | 1.1 km || 
|-id=116 bgcolor=#fefefe
| 270116 ||  || — || September 12, 2001 || Socorro || LINEAR || H || align=right data-sort-value="0.77" | 770 m || 
|-id=117 bgcolor=#E9E9E9
| 270117 ||  || — || September 12, 2001 || Socorro || LINEAR || — || align=right | 1.2 km || 
|-id=118 bgcolor=#fefefe
| 270118 ||  || — || September 10, 2001 || Socorro || LINEAR || — || align=right | 1.7 km || 
|-id=119 bgcolor=#E9E9E9
| 270119 ||  || — || September 10, 2001 || Socorro || LINEAR || — || align=right | 1.3 km || 
|-id=120 bgcolor=#d6d6d6
| 270120 ||  || — || September 11, 2001 || Anderson Mesa || LONEOS || — || align=right | 4.7 km || 
|-id=121 bgcolor=#fefefe
| 270121 ||  || — || September 11, 2001 || Kitt Peak || Spacewatch || — || align=right | 1.0 km || 
|-id=122 bgcolor=#fefefe
| 270122 ||  || — || September 12, 2001 || Socorro || LINEAR || V || align=right | 1.1 km || 
|-id=123 bgcolor=#fefefe
| 270123 ||  || — || September 12, 2001 || Socorro || LINEAR || — || align=right | 1.0 km || 
|-id=124 bgcolor=#fefefe
| 270124 ||  || — || September 12, 2001 || Socorro || LINEAR || — || align=right | 1.0 km || 
|-id=125 bgcolor=#d6d6d6
| 270125 ||  || — || September 12, 2001 || Socorro || LINEAR || THM || align=right | 2.9 km || 
|-id=126 bgcolor=#fefefe
| 270126 ||  || — || September 12, 2001 || Socorro || LINEAR || MAS || align=right data-sort-value="0.88" | 880 m || 
|-id=127 bgcolor=#fefefe
| 270127 ||  || — || September 12, 2001 || Socorro || LINEAR || NYS || align=right data-sort-value="0.92" | 920 m || 
|-id=128 bgcolor=#fefefe
| 270128 ||  || — || September 12, 2001 || Socorro || LINEAR || — || align=right data-sort-value="0.82" | 820 m || 
|-id=129 bgcolor=#E9E9E9
| 270129 ||  || — || September 12, 2001 || Socorro || LINEAR || — || align=right | 1.9 km || 
|-id=130 bgcolor=#fefefe
| 270130 ||  || — || September 12, 2001 || Socorro || LINEAR || NYS || align=right data-sort-value="0.72" | 720 m || 
|-id=131 bgcolor=#d6d6d6
| 270131 ||  || — || September 12, 2001 || Socorro || LINEAR || — || align=right | 5.0 km || 
|-id=132 bgcolor=#fefefe
| 270132 ||  || — || September 12, 2001 || Socorro || LINEAR || NYS || align=right data-sort-value="0.79" | 790 m || 
|-id=133 bgcolor=#fefefe
| 270133 ||  || — || September 12, 2001 || Socorro || LINEAR || MAS || align=right | 1.0 km || 
|-id=134 bgcolor=#fefefe
| 270134 ||  || — || September 12, 2001 || Socorro || LINEAR || — || align=right | 1.1 km || 
|-id=135 bgcolor=#fefefe
| 270135 ||  || — || September 12, 2001 || Socorro || LINEAR || V || align=right data-sort-value="0.98" | 980 m || 
|-id=136 bgcolor=#E9E9E9
| 270136 ||  || — || September 12, 2001 || Socorro || LINEAR || — || align=right | 1.1 km || 
|-id=137 bgcolor=#E9E9E9
| 270137 ||  || — || September 12, 2001 || Socorro || LINEAR || — || align=right | 1.8 km || 
|-id=138 bgcolor=#fefefe
| 270138 ||  || — || September 12, 2001 || Socorro || LINEAR || — || align=right data-sort-value="0.89" | 890 m || 
|-id=139 bgcolor=#fefefe
| 270139 ||  || — || September 17, 2001 || Desert Eagle || W. K. Y. Yeung || CLA || align=right | 2.7 km || 
|-id=140 bgcolor=#fefefe
| 270140 ||  || — || September 17, 2001 || Socorro || LINEAR || H || align=right data-sort-value="0.77" | 770 m || 
|-id=141 bgcolor=#E9E9E9
| 270141 ||  || — || September 18, 2001 || Desert Eagle || W. K. Y. Yeung || — || align=right | 1.00 km || 
|-id=142 bgcolor=#d6d6d6
| 270142 ||  || — || September 16, 2001 || Socorro || LINEAR || VER || align=right | 4.2 km || 
|-id=143 bgcolor=#E9E9E9
| 270143 ||  || — || September 16, 2001 || Socorro || LINEAR || — || align=right | 1.0 km || 
|-id=144 bgcolor=#fefefe
| 270144 ||  || — || September 16, 2001 || Socorro || LINEAR || — || align=right | 1.2 km || 
|-id=145 bgcolor=#fefefe
| 270145 ||  || — || September 16, 2001 || Socorro || LINEAR || MAS || align=right data-sort-value="0.91" | 910 m || 
|-id=146 bgcolor=#E9E9E9
| 270146 ||  || — || September 16, 2001 || Socorro || LINEAR || — || align=right | 1.6 km || 
|-id=147 bgcolor=#FA8072
| 270147 ||  || — || September 17, 2001 || Socorro || LINEAR || — || align=right | 1.2 km || 
|-id=148 bgcolor=#fefefe
| 270148 ||  || — || September 17, 2001 || Socorro || LINEAR || CIM || align=right | 3.2 km || 
|-id=149 bgcolor=#fefefe
| 270149 ||  || — || September 19, 2001 || Socorro || LINEAR || H || align=right data-sort-value="0.60" | 600 m || 
|-id=150 bgcolor=#fefefe
| 270150 ||  || — || September 20, 2001 || Socorro || LINEAR || — || align=right | 1.1 km || 
|-id=151 bgcolor=#fefefe
| 270151 ||  || — || September 20, 2001 || Socorro || LINEAR || — || align=right data-sort-value="0.87" | 870 m || 
|-id=152 bgcolor=#fefefe
| 270152 ||  || — || September 20, 2001 || Socorro || LINEAR || — || align=right data-sort-value="0.91" | 910 m || 
|-id=153 bgcolor=#fefefe
| 270153 ||  || — || September 20, 2001 || Socorro || LINEAR || — || align=right | 1.1 km || 
|-id=154 bgcolor=#fefefe
| 270154 ||  || — || September 20, 2001 || Socorro || LINEAR || CLA || align=right | 1.8 km || 
|-id=155 bgcolor=#fefefe
| 270155 ||  || — || September 20, 2001 || Socorro || LINEAR || — || align=right | 2.1 km || 
|-id=156 bgcolor=#fefefe
| 270156 ||  || — || September 19, 2001 || Socorro || LINEAR || H || align=right data-sort-value="0.66" | 660 m || 
|-id=157 bgcolor=#E9E9E9
| 270157 ||  || — || September 16, 2001 || Socorro || LINEAR || — || align=right | 1.1 km || 
|-id=158 bgcolor=#fefefe
| 270158 ||  || — || September 16, 2001 || Socorro || LINEAR || MAS || align=right data-sort-value="0.94" | 940 m || 
|-id=159 bgcolor=#fefefe
| 270159 ||  || — || September 16, 2001 || Socorro || LINEAR || NYS || align=right data-sort-value="0.96" | 960 m || 
|-id=160 bgcolor=#d6d6d6
| 270160 ||  || — || September 16, 2001 || Socorro || LINEAR || TIR || align=right | 3.5 km || 
|-id=161 bgcolor=#d6d6d6
| 270161 ||  || — || September 17, 2001 || Socorro || LINEAR || SYL7:4 || align=right | 5.5 km || 
|-id=162 bgcolor=#fefefe
| 270162 ||  || — || September 17, 2001 || Socorro || LINEAR || — || align=right | 1.2 km || 
|-id=163 bgcolor=#fefefe
| 270163 ||  || — || September 16, 2001 || Socorro || LINEAR || — || align=right | 1.0 km || 
|-id=164 bgcolor=#fefefe
| 270164 ||  || — || September 16, 2001 || Socorro || LINEAR || NYS || align=right data-sort-value="0.92" | 920 m || 
|-id=165 bgcolor=#fefefe
| 270165 ||  || — || September 16, 2001 || Socorro || LINEAR || — || align=right | 1.5 km || 
|-id=166 bgcolor=#fefefe
| 270166 ||  || — || September 16, 2001 || Socorro || LINEAR || — || align=right | 1.5 km || 
|-id=167 bgcolor=#fefefe
| 270167 ||  || — || September 19, 2001 || Socorro || LINEAR || — || align=right | 1.0 km || 
|-id=168 bgcolor=#d6d6d6
| 270168 ||  || — || September 19, 2001 || Socorro || LINEAR || THM || align=right | 2.8 km || 
|-id=169 bgcolor=#fefefe
| 270169 ||  || — || September 19, 2001 || Socorro || LINEAR || MAS || align=right data-sort-value="0.99" | 990 m || 
|-id=170 bgcolor=#fefefe
| 270170 ||  || — || September 19, 2001 || Socorro || LINEAR || NYS || align=right data-sort-value="0.83" | 830 m || 
|-id=171 bgcolor=#fefefe
| 270171 ||  || — || September 19, 2001 || Socorro || LINEAR || NYS || align=right data-sort-value="0.83" | 830 m || 
|-id=172 bgcolor=#fefefe
| 270172 ||  || — || September 19, 2001 || Socorro || LINEAR || — || align=right | 1.0 km || 
|-id=173 bgcolor=#fefefe
| 270173 ||  || — || September 19, 2001 || Socorro || LINEAR || NYS || align=right data-sort-value="0.91" | 910 m || 
|-id=174 bgcolor=#fefefe
| 270174 ||  || — || September 19, 2001 || Socorro || LINEAR || NYS || align=right data-sort-value="0.76" | 760 m || 
|-id=175 bgcolor=#fefefe
| 270175 ||  || — || September 19, 2001 || Socorro || LINEAR || — || align=right | 1.2 km || 
|-id=176 bgcolor=#fefefe
| 270176 ||  || — || September 19, 2001 || Socorro || LINEAR || — || align=right | 1.3 km || 
|-id=177 bgcolor=#fefefe
| 270177 ||  || — || September 19, 2001 || Socorro || LINEAR || — || align=right | 1.1 km || 
|-id=178 bgcolor=#fefefe
| 270178 ||  || — || September 20, 2001 || Socorro || LINEAR || NYS || align=right data-sort-value="0.92" | 920 m || 
|-id=179 bgcolor=#fefefe
| 270179 ||  || — || September 25, 2001 || Eskridge || G. Hug || H || align=right data-sort-value="0.77" | 770 m || 
|-id=180 bgcolor=#FA8072
| 270180 ||  || — || September 17, 2001 || Socorro || LINEAR || H || align=right | 1.0 km || 
|-id=181 bgcolor=#fefefe
| 270181 ||  || — || September 18, 2001 || Kitt Peak || Spacewatch || MAS || align=right data-sort-value="0.86" | 860 m || 
|-id=182 bgcolor=#fefefe
| 270182 ||  || — || September 20, 2001 || Kitt Peak || Spacewatch || V || align=right data-sort-value="0.61" | 610 m || 
|-id=183 bgcolor=#E9E9E9
| 270183 ||  || — || September 21, 2001 || Kitt Peak || Spacewatch || — || align=right | 2.0 km || 
|-id=184 bgcolor=#fefefe
| 270184 ||  || — || September 26, 2001 || Socorro || LINEAR || H || align=right data-sort-value="0.85" | 850 m || 
|-id=185 bgcolor=#E9E9E9
| 270185 ||  || — || September 21, 2001 || Anderson Mesa || LONEOS || — || align=right | 1.3 km || 
|-id=186 bgcolor=#fefefe
| 270186 ||  || — || September 28, 2001 || Palomar || NEAT || V || align=right | 1.0 km || 
|-id=187 bgcolor=#fefefe
| 270187 ||  || — || September 20, 2001 || Socorro || LINEAR || NYS || align=right data-sort-value="0.76" | 760 m || 
|-id=188 bgcolor=#fefefe
| 270188 ||  || — || September 21, 2001 || Socorro || LINEAR || — || align=right | 1.1 km || 
|-id=189 bgcolor=#fefefe
| 270189 ||  || — || September 21, 2001 || Socorro || LINEAR || — || align=right | 1.3 km || 
|-id=190 bgcolor=#fefefe
| 270190 ||  || — || September 21, 2001 || Socorro || LINEAR || — || align=right | 1.1 km || 
|-id=191 bgcolor=#fefefe
| 270191 ||  || — || September 19, 2001 || Kitt Peak || Spacewatch || — || align=right data-sort-value="0.84" | 840 m || 
|-id=192 bgcolor=#fefefe
| 270192 ||  || — || September 21, 2001 || Palomar || NEAT || V || align=right data-sort-value="0.89" | 890 m || 
|-id=193 bgcolor=#fefefe
| 270193 ||  || — || September 25, 2001 || Socorro || LINEAR || PHO || align=right | 1.1 km || 
|-id=194 bgcolor=#fefefe
| 270194 ||  || — || September 20, 2001 || Socorro || LINEAR || — || align=right data-sort-value="0.74" | 740 m || 
|-id=195 bgcolor=#E9E9E9
| 270195 ||  || — || September 22, 2001 || Anderson Mesa || LONEOS || EUN || align=right | 1.3 km || 
|-id=196 bgcolor=#d6d6d6
| 270196 ||  || — || September 18, 2001 || Apache Point || SDSS || MEL || align=right | 6.4 km || 
|-id=197 bgcolor=#fefefe
| 270197 ||  || — || October 6, 2001 || Palomar || NEAT || V || align=right data-sort-value="0.87" | 870 m || 
|-id=198 bgcolor=#fefefe
| 270198 ||  || — || October 13, 2001 || Socorro || LINEAR || H || align=right data-sort-value="0.80" | 800 m || 
|-id=199 bgcolor=#FA8072
| 270199 ||  || — || October 14, 2001 || Socorro || LINEAR || H || align=right | 1.2 km || 
|-id=200 bgcolor=#fefefe
| 270200 ||  || — || October 14, 2001 || Socorro || LINEAR || NYS || align=right data-sort-value="0.84" | 840 m || 
|}

270201–270300 

|-bgcolor=#FA8072
| 270201 ||  || — || October 14, 2001 || Socorro || LINEAR || — || align=right | 1.6 km || 
|-id=202 bgcolor=#E9E9E9
| 270202 ||  || — || October 14, 2001 || Socorro || LINEAR || — || align=right | 3.5 km || 
|-id=203 bgcolor=#fefefe
| 270203 ||  || — || October 13, 2001 || Socorro || LINEAR || V || align=right | 1.1 km || 
|-id=204 bgcolor=#fefefe
| 270204 ||  || — || October 13, 2001 || Socorro || LINEAR || NYS || align=right | 1.2 km || 
|-id=205 bgcolor=#E9E9E9
| 270205 ||  || — || October 14, 2001 || Socorro || LINEAR || — || align=right | 2.5 km || 
|-id=206 bgcolor=#fefefe
| 270206 ||  || — || October 14, 2001 || Socorro || LINEAR || — || align=right | 1.4 km || 
|-id=207 bgcolor=#E9E9E9
| 270207 ||  || — || October 14, 2001 || Socorro || LINEAR || — || align=right | 1.3 km || 
|-id=208 bgcolor=#E9E9E9
| 270208 ||  || — || October 14, 2001 || Socorro || LINEAR || — || align=right | 1.3 km || 
|-id=209 bgcolor=#E9E9E9
| 270209 ||  || — || October 14, 2001 || Socorro || LINEAR || — || align=right | 1.6 km || 
|-id=210 bgcolor=#E9E9E9
| 270210 ||  || — || October 14, 2001 || Socorro || LINEAR || — || align=right | 1.1 km || 
|-id=211 bgcolor=#d6d6d6
| 270211 ||  || — || October 14, 2001 || Socorro || LINEAR || SYL7:4 || align=right | 5.8 km || 
|-id=212 bgcolor=#fefefe
| 270212 ||  || — || October 15, 2001 || Socorro || LINEAR || — || align=right | 1.4 km || 
|-id=213 bgcolor=#fefefe
| 270213 ||  || — || October 10, 2001 || Palomar || NEAT || — || align=right | 1.1 km || 
|-id=214 bgcolor=#fefefe
| 270214 ||  || — || October 10, 2001 || Palomar || NEAT || V || align=right | 1.1 km || 
|-id=215 bgcolor=#d6d6d6
| 270215 ||  || — || October 10, 2001 || Palomar || NEAT || — || align=right | 5.1 km || 
|-id=216 bgcolor=#fefefe
| 270216 ||  || — || October 10, 2001 || Palomar || NEAT || — || align=right | 2.0 km || 
|-id=217 bgcolor=#E9E9E9
| 270217 ||  || — || October 10, 2001 || Palomar || NEAT || — || align=right | 1.8 km || 
|-id=218 bgcolor=#E9E9E9
| 270218 ||  || — || October 10, 2001 || Palomar || NEAT || — || align=right | 1.7 km || 
|-id=219 bgcolor=#fefefe
| 270219 ||  || — || October 15, 2001 || Palomar || NEAT || V || align=right | 1.3 km || 
|-id=220 bgcolor=#E9E9E9
| 270220 ||  || — || October 15, 2001 || Socorro || LINEAR || — || align=right | 1.3 km || 
|-id=221 bgcolor=#fefefe
| 270221 ||  || — || October 15, 2001 || Socorro || LINEAR || — || align=right | 1.7 km || 
|-id=222 bgcolor=#E9E9E9
| 270222 ||  || — || October 13, 2001 || Socorro || LINEAR || — || align=right | 1.1 km || 
|-id=223 bgcolor=#fefefe
| 270223 ||  || — || October 14, 2001 || Socorro || LINEAR || MAS || align=right data-sort-value="0.77" | 770 m || 
|-id=224 bgcolor=#E9E9E9
| 270224 ||  || — || October 14, 2001 || Socorro || LINEAR || — || align=right | 2.5 km || 
|-id=225 bgcolor=#fefefe
| 270225 ||  || — || October 14, 2001 || Socorro || LINEAR || SUL || align=right | 1.9 km || 
|-id=226 bgcolor=#E9E9E9
| 270226 ||  || — || October 14, 2001 || Socorro || LINEAR || — || align=right | 1.6 km || 
|-id=227 bgcolor=#fefefe
| 270227 ||  || — || October 14, 2001 || Socorro || LINEAR || — || align=right | 3.6 km || 
|-id=228 bgcolor=#fefefe
| 270228 ||  || — || October 13, 2001 || Palomar || NEAT || — || align=right | 1.4 km || 
|-id=229 bgcolor=#fefefe
| 270229 ||  || — || October 11, 2001 || Socorro || LINEAR || — || align=right | 1.3 km || 
|-id=230 bgcolor=#fefefe
| 270230 ||  || — || October 11, 2001 || Socorro || LINEAR || — || align=right | 1.1 km || 
|-id=231 bgcolor=#E9E9E9
| 270231 ||  || — || October 11, 2001 || Palomar || NEAT || — || align=right | 1.9 km || 
|-id=232 bgcolor=#fefefe
| 270232 ||  || — || October 13, 2001 || Anderson Mesa || LONEOS || V || align=right data-sort-value="0.99" | 990 m || 
|-id=233 bgcolor=#E9E9E9
| 270233 ||  || — || October 13, 2001 || Palomar || NEAT || GEF || align=right | 1.9 km || 
|-id=234 bgcolor=#E9E9E9
| 270234 ||  || — || October 13, 2001 || Palomar || NEAT || — || align=right | 2.3 km || 
|-id=235 bgcolor=#fefefe
| 270235 ||  || — || October 15, 2001 || Kitt Peak || Spacewatch || — || align=right | 1.0 km || 
|-id=236 bgcolor=#fefefe
| 270236 ||  || — || October 10, 2001 || Palomar || NEAT || SUL || align=right | 2.8 km || 
|-id=237 bgcolor=#fefefe
| 270237 ||  || — || October 14, 2001 || Apache Point || SDSS || NYS || align=right data-sort-value="0.63" | 630 m || 
|-id=238 bgcolor=#fefefe
| 270238 ||  || — || October 14, 2001 || Apache Point || SDSS || — || align=right | 1.0 km || 
|-id=239 bgcolor=#fefefe
| 270239 ||  || — || October 14, 2001 || Apache Point || SDSS || — || align=right | 1.0 km || 
|-id=240 bgcolor=#E9E9E9
| 270240 ||  || — || October 21, 2001 || Palomar || NEAT || — || align=right | 1.0 km || 
|-id=241 bgcolor=#fefefe
| 270241 ||  || — || October 23, 2001 || Socorro || LINEAR || H || align=right data-sort-value="0.64" | 640 m || 
|-id=242 bgcolor=#E9E9E9
| 270242 ||  || — || October 24, 2001 || Desert Eagle || W. K. Y. Yeung || — || align=right | 1.4 km || 
|-id=243 bgcolor=#fefefe
| 270243 ||  || — || October 24, 2001 || Powell || Powell Obs. || V || align=right | 1.3 km || 
|-id=244 bgcolor=#fefefe
| 270244 ||  || — || October 16, 2001 || Kitt Peak || Spacewatch || — || align=right data-sort-value="0.99" | 990 m || 
|-id=245 bgcolor=#fefefe
| 270245 ||  || — || October 17, 2001 || Socorro || LINEAR || H || align=right data-sort-value="0.81" | 810 m || 
|-id=246 bgcolor=#E9E9E9
| 270246 ||  || — || October 17, 2001 || Socorro || LINEAR || — || align=right | 1.5 km || 
|-id=247 bgcolor=#E9E9E9
| 270247 ||  || — || October 18, 2001 || Socorro || LINEAR || — || align=right | 3.6 km || 
|-id=248 bgcolor=#E9E9E9
| 270248 ||  || — || October 18, 2001 || Socorro || LINEAR || — || align=right | 1.8 km || 
|-id=249 bgcolor=#E9E9E9
| 270249 ||  || — || October 16, 2001 || Socorro || LINEAR || — || align=right | 1.2 km || 
|-id=250 bgcolor=#fefefe
| 270250 ||  || — || October 16, 2001 || Socorro || LINEAR || — || align=right | 2.1 km || 
|-id=251 bgcolor=#fefefe
| 270251 ||  || — || October 16, 2001 || Socorro || LINEAR || — || align=right | 1.2 km || 
|-id=252 bgcolor=#fefefe
| 270252 ||  || — || October 16, 2001 || Socorro || LINEAR || — || align=right | 1.7 km || 
|-id=253 bgcolor=#fefefe
| 270253 ||  || — || October 16, 2001 || Socorro || LINEAR || KLI || align=right | 3.6 km || 
|-id=254 bgcolor=#fefefe
| 270254 ||  || — || October 17, 2001 || Socorro || LINEAR || — || align=right | 1.1 km || 
|-id=255 bgcolor=#E9E9E9
| 270255 ||  || — || October 17, 2001 || Socorro || LINEAR || — || align=right | 1.7 km || 
|-id=256 bgcolor=#fefefe
| 270256 ||  || — || October 17, 2001 || Socorro || LINEAR || NYS || align=right data-sort-value="0.81" | 810 m || 
|-id=257 bgcolor=#fefefe
| 270257 ||  || — || October 17, 2001 || Socorro || LINEAR || — || align=right | 1.2 km || 
|-id=258 bgcolor=#fefefe
| 270258 ||  || — || October 20, 2001 || Socorro || LINEAR || — || align=right | 1.0 km || 
|-id=259 bgcolor=#fefefe
| 270259 ||  || — || October 20, 2001 || Socorro || LINEAR || V || align=right | 1.1 km || 
|-id=260 bgcolor=#fefefe
| 270260 ||  || — || October 22, 2001 || Socorro || LINEAR || — || align=right | 1.2 km || 
|-id=261 bgcolor=#fefefe
| 270261 ||  || — || October 22, 2001 || Socorro || LINEAR || — || align=right | 1.2 km || 
|-id=262 bgcolor=#E9E9E9
| 270262 ||  || — || October 23, 2001 || Socorro || LINEAR || — || align=right | 1.3 km || 
|-id=263 bgcolor=#d6d6d6
| 270263 ||  || — || October 23, 2001 || Socorro || LINEAR || SYL7:4 || align=right | 5.5 km || 
|-id=264 bgcolor=#fefefe
| 270264 ||  || — || October 23, 2001 || Socorro || LINEAR || NYS || align=right | 1.1 km || 
|-id=265 bgcolor=#E9E9E9
| 270265 ||  || — || October 23, 2001 || Socorro || LINEAR || — || align=right | 1.0 km || 
|-id=266 bgcolor=#fefefe
| 270266 ||  || — || October 18, 2001 || Kitt Peak || Spacewatch || NYS || align=right data-sort-value="0.84" | 840 m || 
|-id=267 bgcolor=#fefefe
| 270267 ||  || — || October 24, 2001 || Kitt Peak || Spacewatch || NYS || align=right data-sort-value="0.81" | 810 m || 
|-id=268 bgcolor=#E9E9E9
| 270268 ||  || — || October 21, 2001 || Socorro || LINEAR || — || align=right | 1.0 km || 
|-id=269 bgcolor=#E9E9E9
| 270269 ||  || — || October 18, 2001 || Palomar || NEAT || — || align=right | 2.7 km || 
|-id=270 bgcolor=#fefefe
| 270270 ||  || — || October 18, 2001 || Palomar || NEAT || — || align=right | 1.2 km || 
|-id=271 bgcolor=#fefefe
| 270271 ||  || — || October 24, 2001 || Palomar || NEAT || — || align=right | 1.4 km || 
|-id=272 bgcolor=#E9E9E9
| 270272 ||  || — || October 16, 2001 || Palomar || NEAT || — || align=right | 1.2 km || 
|-id=273 bgcolor=#fefefe
| 270273 ||  || — || October 17, 2001 || Palomar || NEAT || V || align=right data-sort-value="0.83" | 830 m || 
|-id=274 bgcolor=#E9E9E9
| 270274 ||  || — || October 18, 2001 || Palomar || NEAT || — || align=right | 2.8 km || 
|-id=275 bgcolor=#fefefe
| 270275 ||  || — || October 21, 2001 || Socorro || LINEAR || NYS || align=right data-sort-value="0.92" | 920 m || 
|-id=276 bgcolor=#E9E9E9
| 270276 ||  || — || October 23, 2001 || Socorro || LINEAR || MAR || align=right | 1.3 km || 
|-id=277 bgcolor=#fefefe
| 270277 ||  || — || October 16, 2001 || Palomar || NEAT || — || align=right | 1.0 km || 
|-id=278 bgcolor=#E9E9E9
| 270278 ||  || — || November 9, 2001 || Socorro || LINEAR || — || align=right | 1.6 km || 
|-id=279 bgcolor=#E9E9E9
| 270279 ||  || — || November 9, 2001 || Socorro || LINEAR || — || align=right | 1.2 km || 
|-id=280 bgcolor=#E9E9E9
| 270280 ||  || — || November 10, 2001 || Socorro || LINEAR || — || align=right | 1.7 km || 
|-id=281 bgcolor=#fefefe
| 270281 ||  || — || November 9, 2001 || Socorro || LINEAR || V || align=right | 1.1 km || 
|-id=282 bgcolor=#E9E9E9
| 270282 ||  || — || November 9, 2001 || Socorro || LINEAR || — || align=right | 2.3 km || 
|-id=283 bgcolor=#fefefe
| 270283 ||  || — || November 10, 2001 || Socorro || LINEAR || — || align=right | 1.2 km || 
|-id=284 bgcolor=#E9E9E9
| 270284 ||  || — || November 11, 2001 || Socorro || LINEAR || — || align=right | 1.8 km || 
|-id=285 bgcolor=#E9E9E9
| 270285 ||  || — || November 11, 2001 || Socorro || LINEAR || GAL || align=right | 2.5 km || 
|-id=286 bgcolor=#fefefe
| 270286 ||  || — || November 15, 2001 || Socorro || LINEAR || H || align=right | 1.3 km || 
|-id=287 bgcolor=#E9E9E9
| 270287 ||  || — || November 9, 2001 || Palomar || NEAT || — || align=right | 1.8 km || 
|-id=288 bgcolor=#fefefe
| 270288 ||  || — || November 10, 2001 || Socorro || LINEAR || — || align=right | 1.3 km || 
|-id=289 bgcolor=#fefefe
| 270289 ||  || — || November 12, 2001 || Haleakala || NEAT || — || align=right | 1.3 km || 
|-id=290 bgcolor=#E9E9E9
| 270290 ||  || — || November 12, 2001 || Socorro || LINEAR || — || align=right | 1.4 km || 
|-id=291 bgcolor=#E9E9E9
| 270291 ||  || — || November 12, 2001 || Socorro || LINEAR || — || align=right | 1.7 km || 
|-id=292 bgcolor=#E9E9E9
| 270292 ||  || — || November 12, 2001 || Socorro || LINEAR || — || align=right | 2.3 km || 
|-id=293 bgcolor=#E9E9E9
| 270293 ||  || — || November 12, 2001 || Socorro || LINEAR || — || align=right | 1.4 km || 
|-id=294 bgcolor=#E9E9E9
| 270294 ||  || — || November 12, 2001 || Socorro || LINEAR || — || align=right | 3.0 km || 
|-id=295 bgcolor=#d6d6d6
| 270295 ||  || — || November 12, 2001 || Socorro || LINEAR || 3:2 || align=right | 6.3 km || 
|-id=296 bgcolor=#E9E9E9
| 270296 ||  || — || November 12, 2001 || Socorro || LINEAR || — || align=right | 1.9 km || 
|-id=297 bgcolor=#E9E9E9
| 270297 ||  || — || November 12, 2001 || Socorro || LINEAR || — || align=right | 1.2 km || 
|-id=298 bgcolor=#fefefe
| 270298 ||  || — || November 11, 2001 || Apache Point || SDSS || — || align=right | 1.0 km || 
|-id=299 bgcolor=#fefefe
| 270299 ||  || — || November 11, 2001 || Apache Point || SDSS || — || align=right | 1.1 km || 
|-id=300 bgcolor=#E9E9E9
| 270300 ||  || — || November 11, 2001 || Apache Point || SDSS || — || align=right data-sort-value="0.82" | 820 m || 
|}

270301–270400 

|-bgcolor=#E9E9E9
| 270301 ||  || — || November 8, 2001 || Socorro || LINEAR || MIT || align=right | 3.0 km || 
|-id=302 bgcolor=#fefefe
| 270302 ||  || — || November 18, 2001 || Socorro || LINEAR || H || align=right | 1.0 km || 
|-id=303 bgcolor=#FA8072
| 270303 ||  || — || November 18, 2001 || Socorro || LINEAR || — || align=right | 3.0 km || 
|-id=304 bgcolor=#fefefe
| 270304 ||  || — || November 16, 2001 || Kitt Peak || Spacewatch || V || align=right data-sort-value="0.94" | 940 m || 
|-id=305 bgcolor=#E9E9E9
| 270305 ||  || — || November 17, 2001 || Socorro || LINEAR || — || align=right data-sort-value="0.82" | 820 m || 
|-id=306 bgcolor=#fefefe
| 270306 ||  || — || November 18, 2001 || Socorro || LINEAR || — || align=right data-sort-value="0.91" | 910 m || 
|-id=307 bgcolor=#fefefe
| 270307 ||  || — || November 18, 2001 || Socorro || LINEAR || NYS || align=right data-sort-value="0.99" | 990 m || 
|-id=308 bgcolor=#E9E9E9
| 270308 ||  || — || November 19, 2001 || Socorro || LINEAR || — || align=right | 1.6 km || 
|-id=309 bgcolor=#fefefe
| 270309 ||  || — || November 20, 2001 || Socorro || LINEAR || — || align=right | 1.2 km || 
|-id=310 bgcolor=#E9E9E9
| 270310 ||  || — || November 20, 2001 || Socorro || LINEAR || — || align=right | 1.2 km || 
|-id=311 bgcolor=#fefefe
| 270311 ||  || — || November 20, 2001 || Socorro || LINEAR || NYS || align=right data-sort-value="0.90" | 900 m || 
|-id=312 bgcolor=#E9E9E9
| 270312 ||  || — || November 20, 2001 || Socorro || LINEAR || — || align=right | 1.4 km || 
|-id=313 bgcolor=#E9E9E9
| 270313 ||  || — || December 3, 2001 || Socorro || LINEAR || — || align=right | 2.4 km || 
|-id=314 bgcolor=#E9E9E9
| 270314 ||  || — || December 9, 2001 || Socorro || LINEAR || — || align=right | 1.0 km || 
|-id=315 bgcolor=#E9E9E9
| 270315 ||  || — || December 9, 2001 || Socorro || LINEAR || — || align=right | 4.1 km || 
|-id=316 bgcolor=#E9E9E9
| 270316 ||  || — || December 10, 2001 || Socorro || LINEAR || — || align=right | 2.5 km || 
|-id=317 bgcolor=#E9E9E9
| 270317 ||  || — || December 9, 2001 || Socorro || LINEAR || — || align=right | 2.0 km || 
|-id=318 bgcolor=#E9E9E9
| 270318 ||  || — || December 11, 2001 || Socorro || LINEAR || — || align=right | 2.2 km || 
|-id=319 bgcolor=#E9E9E9
| 270319 ||  || — || December 7, 2001 || Kitt Peak || Spacewatch || — || align=right | 1.4 km || 
|-id=320 bgcolor=#E9E9E9
| 270320 ||  || — || December 9, 2001 || Socorro || LINEAR || — || align=right | 2.3 km || 
|-id=321 bgcolor=#E9E9E9
| 270321 ||  || — || December 9, 2001 || Socorro || LINEAR || JUN || align=right | 1.4 km || 
|-id=322 bgcolor=#E9E9E9
| 270322 ||  || — || December 10, 2001 || Socorro || LINEAR || MIT || align=right | 2.1 km || 
|-id=323 bgcolor=#E9E9E9
| 270323 ||  || — || December 10, 2001 || Socorro || LINEAR || — || align=right data-sort-value="0.89" | 890 m || 
|-id=324 bgcolor=#E9E9E9
| 270324 ||  || — || December 10, 2001 || Socorro || LINEAR || — || align=right | 1.8 km || 
|-id=325 bgcolor=#fefefe
| 270325 ||  || — || December 14, 2001 || Socorro || LINEAR || slow || align=right data-sort-value="0.99" | 990 m || 
|-id=326 bgcolor=#d6d6d6
| 270326 ||  || — || December 11, 2001 || Socorro || LINEAR || VER || align=right | 4.7 km || 
|-id=327 bgcolor=#E9E9E9
| 270327 ||  || — || December 11, 2001 || Socorro || LINEAR || — || align=right | 1.8 km || 
|-id=328 bgcolor=#E9E9E9
| 270328 ||  || — || December 13, 2001 || Socorro || LINEAR || — || align=right | 1.5 km || 
|-id=329 bgcolor=#E9E9E9
| 270329 ||  || — || December 13, 2001 || Socorro || LINEAR || MAR || align=right | 1.6 km || 
|-id=330 bgcolor=#fefefe
| 270330 ||  || — || December 14, 2001 || Socorro || LINEAR || — || align=right | 1.6 km || 
|-id=331 bgcolor=#E9E9E9
| 270331 ||  || — || December 14, 2001 || Socorro || LINEAR || — || align=right | 1.5 km || 
|-id=332 bgcolor=#E9E9E9
| 270332 ||  || — || December 14, 2001 || Socorro || LINEAR || — || align=right | 1.5 km || 
|-id=333 bgcolor=#E9E9E9
| 270333 ||  || — || December 14, 2001 || Socorro || LINEAR || — || align=right | 2.3 km || 
|-id=334 bgcolor=#E9E9E9
| 270334 ||  || — || December 14, 2001 || Socorro || LINEAR || — || align=right | 1.6 km || 
|-id=335 bgcolor=#E9E9E9
| 270335 ||  || — || December 14, 2001 || Socorro || LINEAR || — || align=right | 2.6 km || 
|-id=336 bgcolor=#E9E9E9
| 270336 ||  || — || December 14, 2001 || Socorro || LINEAR || — || align=right | 2.8 km || 
|-id=337 bgcolor=#E9E9E9
| 270337 ||  || — || December 14, 2001 || Socorro || LINEAR || — || align=right | 1.3 km || 
|-id=338 bgcolor=#E9E9E9
| 270338 ||  || — || December 14, 2001 || Socorro || LINEAR || — || align=right | 1.9 km || 
|-id=339 bgcolor=#E9E9E9
| 270339 ||  || — || December 14, 2001 || Socorro || LINEAR || JUN || align=right | 1.4 km || 
|-id=340 bgcolor=#E9E9E9
| 270340 ||  || — || December 11, 2001 || Socorro || LINEAR || — || align=right | 1.3 km || 
|-id=341 bgcolor=#E9E9E9
| 270341 ||  || — || December 15, 2001 || Socorro || LINEAR || — || align=right | 1.5 km || 
|-id=342 bgcolor=#E9E9E9
| 270342 ||  || — || December 15, 2001 || Socorro || LINEAR || MAR || align=right | 1.3 km || 
|-id=343 bgcolor=#E9E9E9
| 270343 ||  || — || December 15, 2001 || Socorro || LINEAR || GEF || align=right | 1.6 km || 
|-id=344 bgcolor=#E9E9E9
| 270344 ||  || — || December 15, 2001 || Socorro || LINEAR || — || align=right | 1.1 km || 
|-id=345 bgcolor=#E9E9E9
| 270345 ||  || — || December 15, 2001 || Socorro || LINEAR || MIT || align=right | 2.6 km || 
|-id=346 bgcolor=#E9E9E9
| 270346 ||  || — || December 14, 2001 || Kitt Peak || Spacewatch || — || align=right | 1.2 km || 
|-id=347 bgcolor=#E9E9E9
| 270347 ||  || — || December 14, 2001 || Socorro || LINEAR || — || align=right | 1.7 km || 
|-id=348 bgcolor=#E9E9E9
| 270348 ||  || — || December 13, 2001 || Palomar || NEAT || — || align=right | 3.6 km || 
|-id=349 bgcolor=#E9E9E9
| 270349 ||  || — || December 15, 2001 || Apache Point || SDSS || — || align=right | 1.8 km || 
|-id=350 bgcolor=#E9E9E9
| 270350 ||  || — || December 23, 2001 || Kingsnake || J. V. McClusky || HNS || align=right | 1.6 km || 
|-id=351 bgcolor=#E9E9E9
| 270351 ||  || — || December 18, 2001 || Socorro || LINEAR || — || align=right | 1.4 km || 
|-id=352 bgcolor=#E9E9E9
| 270352 ||  || — || December 18, 2001 || Socorro || LINEAR || RAF || align=right | 1.2 km || 
|-id=353 bgcolor=#E9E9E9
| 270353 ||  || — || December 18, 2001 || Socorro || LINEAR || — || align=right | 2.0 km || 
|-id=354 bgcolor=#E9E9E9
| 270354 ||  || — || December 18, 2001 || Socorro || LINEAR || — || align=right | 1.2 km || 
|-id=355 bgcolor=#E9E9E9
| 270355 ||  || — || December 18, 2001 || Socorro || LINEAR || — || align=right | 1.3 km || 
|-id=356 bgcolor=#d6d6d6
| 270356 ||  || — || December 18, 2001 || Socorro || LINEAR || HIL3:2 || align=right | 7.3 km || 
|-id=357 bgcolor=#E9E9E9
| 270357 ||  || — || December 18, 2001 || Socorro || LINEAR || — || align=right | 1.3 km || 
|-id=358 bgcolor=#d6d6d6
| 270358 ||  || — || December 18, 2001 || Socorro || LINEAR || 3:2 || align=right | 4.6 km || 
|-id=359 bgcolor=#E9E9E9
| 270359 ||  || — || December 18, 2001 || Socorro || LINEAR || — || align=right | 1.4 km || 
|-id=360 bgcolor=#E9E9E9
| 270360 ||  || — || December 18, 2001 || Socorro || LINEAR || — || align=right | 1.3 km || 
|-id=361 bgcolor=#E9E9E9
| 270361 ||  || — || December 18, 2001 || Socorro || LINEAR || — || align=right | 2.0 km || 
|-id=362 bgcolor=#E9E9E9
| 270362 ||  || — || December 17, 2001 || Palomar || NEAT || JUN || align=right | 1.7 km || 
|-id=363 bgcolor=#E9E9E9
| 270363 ||  || — || December 17, 2001 || Socorro || LINEAR || — || align=right data-sort-value="0.95" | 950 m || 
|-id=364 bgcolor=#E9E9E9
| 270364 ||  || — || December 17, 2001 || Socorro || LINEAR || — || align=right | 1.9 km || 
|-id=365 bgcolor=#E9E9E9
| 270365 ||  || — || December 18, 2001 || Socorro || LINEAR || — || align=right | 1.8 km || 
|-id=366 bgcolor=#E9E9E9
| 270366 ||  || — || December 17, 2001 || Socorro || LINEAR || HNS || align=right | 1.6 km || 
|-id=367 bgcolor=#E9E9E9
| 270367 ||  || — || December 17, 2001 || Socorro || LINEAR || — || align=right | 2.4 km || 
|-id=368 bgcolor=#E9E9E9
| 270368 ||  || — || December 17, 2001 || Socorro || LINEAR || — || align=right | 1.6 km || 
|-id=369 bgcolor=#E9E9E9
| 270369 ||  || — || December 22, 2001 || Kitt Peak || Spacewatch || — || align=right | 1.3 km || 
|-id=370 bgcolor=#E9E9E9
| 270370 ||  || — || December 23, 2001 || Kitt Peak || Spacewatch || — || align=right | 2.6 km || 
|-id=371 bgcolor=#E9E9E9
| 270371 ||  || — || December 18, 2001 || Apache Point || SDSS || — || align=right | 1.5 km || 
|-id=372 bgcolor=#E9E9E9
| 270372 ||  || — || December 18, 2001 || Apache Point || SDSS || MAR || align=right | 1.4 km || 
|-id=373 bgcolor=#fefefe
| 270373 William ||  ||  || January 7, 2002 || Ibis || J. Edmonds || H || align=right data-sort-value="0.80" | 800 m || 
|-id=374 bgcolor=#E9E9E9
| 270374 ||  || — || January 10, 2002 || Campo Imperatore || CINEOS || — || align=right | 2.3 km || 
|-id=375 bgcolor=#E9E9E9
| 270375 ||  || — || January 8, 2002 || Palomar || NEAT || — || align=right | 1.3 km || 
|-id=376 bgcolor=#E9E9E9
| 270376 ||  || — || January 9, 2002 || Socorro || LINEAR || — || align=right | 1.9 km || 
|-id=377 bgcolor=#E9E9E9
| 270377 ||  || — || January 9, 2002 || Socorro || LINEAR || VIB || align=right | 2.0 km || 
|-id=378 bgcolor=#E9E9E9
| 270378 ||  || — || December 10, 2001 || Kitt Peak || Spacewatch || — || align=right | 1.6 km || 
|-id=379 bgcolor=#E9E9E9
| 270379 ||  || — || January 9, 2002 || Socorro || LINEAR || — || align=right | 3.3 km || 
|-id=380 bgcolor=#E9E9E9
| 270380 ||  || — || January 9, 2002 || Socorro || LINEAR || — || align=right | 1.9 km || 
|-id=381 bgcolor=#E9E9E9
| 270381 ||  || — || January 11, 2002 || Socorro || LINEAR || — || align=right | 2.4 km || 
|-id=382 bgcolor=#E9E9E9
| 270382 ||  || — || January 9, 2002 || Socorro || LINEAR || — || align=right | 1.7 km || 
|-id=383 bgcolor=#E9E9E9
| 270383 ||  || — || January 8, 2002 || Socorro || LINEAR || — || align=right | 1.3 km || 
|-id=384 bgcolor=#E9E9E9
| 270384 ||  || — || January 9, 2002 || Socorro || LINEAR || — || align=right | 2.2 km || 
|-id=385 bgcolor=#E9E9E9
| 270385 ||  || — || January 9, 2002 || Socorro || LINEAR || — || align=right | 1.5 km || 
|-id=386 bgcolor=#E9E9E9
| 270386 ||  || — || January 9, 2002 || Socorro || LINEAR || — || align=right | 1.3 km || 
|-id=387 bgcolor=#E9E9E9
| 270387 ||  || — || January 15, 2002 || Kingsnake || J. V. McClusky || — || align=right | 6.3 km || 
|-id=388 bgcolor=#E9E9E9
| 270388 ||  || — || January 9, 2002 || Socorro || LINEAR || — || align=right | 1.3 km || 
|-id=389 bgcolor=#fefefe
| 270389 ||  || — || January 13, 2002 || Socorro || LINEAR || V || align=right | 1.2 km || 
|-id=390 bgcolor=#E9E9E9
| 270390 ||  || — || January 13, 2002 || Socorro || LINEAR || — || align=right | 2.5 km || 
|-id=391 bgcolor=#E9E9E9
| 270391 ||  || — || January 13, 2002 || Socorro || LINEAR || — || align=right | 2.7 km || 
|-id=392 bgcolor=#E9E9E9
| 270392 ||  || — || January 14, 2002 || Socorro || LINEAR || — || align=right | 2.2 km || 
|-id=393 bgcolor=#E9E9E9
| 270393 ||  || — || January 13, 2002 || Socorro || LINEAR || — || align=right | 1.5 km || 
|-id=394 bgcolor=#E9E9E9
| 270394 ||  || — || January 13, 2002 || Socorro || LINEAR || — || align=right | 1.2 km || 
|-id=395 bgcolor=#E9E9E9
| 270395 ||  || — || January 13, 2002 || Socorro || LINEAR || RAF || align=right | 1.8 km || 
|-id=396 bgcolor=#d6d6d6
| 270396 ||  || — || January 9, 2002 || Socorro || LINEAR || SHU3:2 || align=right | 7.6 km || 
|-id=397 bgcolor=#E9E9E9
| 270397 ||  || — || January 10, 2002 || Palomar || NEAT || — || align=right | 1.5 km || 
|-id=398 bgcolor=#E9E9E9
| 270398 ||  || — || January 10, 2002 || Palomar || NEAT || JUN || align=right | 1.2 km || 
|-id=399 bgcolor=#E9E9E9
| 270399 ||  || — || January 10, 2002 || Palomar || NEAT || — || align=right | 3.9 km || 
|-id=400 bgcolor=#E9E9E9
| 270400 ||  || — || January 11, 2002 || Kitt Peak || Spacewatch || — || align=right | 1.7 km || 
|}

270401–270500 

|-bgcolor=#E9E9E9
| 270401 ||  || — || January 11, 2002 || Kitt Peak || Spacewatch || — || align=right | 1.1 km || 
|-id=402 bgcolor=#E9E9E9
| 270402 ||  || — || December 23, 2001 || Kitt Peak || Spacewatch || — || align=right | 1.8 km || 
|-id=403 bgcolor=#E9E9E9
| 270403 ||  || — || January 8, 2002 || Palomar || NEAT || — || align=right | 1.6 km || 
|-id=404 bgcolor=#E9E9E9
| 270404 ||  || — || January 9, 2002 || Palomar || NEAT || — || align=right | 1.8 km || 
|-id=405 bgcolor=#E9E9E9
| 270405 ||  || — || January 9, 2002 || Socorro || LINEAR || — || align=right | 1.7 km || 
|-id=406 bgcolor=#E9E9E9
| 270406 ||  || — || January 6, 2002 || Palomar || NEAT || — || align=right | 1.6 km || 
|-id=407 bgcolor=#E9E9E9
| 270407 ||  || — || January 19, 2002 || Anderson Mesa || LONEOS || — || align=right | 1.7 km || 
|-id=408 bgcolor=#E9E9E9
| 270408 ||  || — || January 22, 2002 || Socorro || LINEAR || — || align=right | 2.5 km || 
|-id=409 bgcolor=#E9E9E9
| 270409 ||  || — || February 3, 2002 || Palomar || NEAT || — || align=right | 3.9 km || 
|-id=410 bgcolor=#E9E9E9
| 270410 ||  || — || February 3, 2002 || Palomar || NEAT || — || align=right | 1.7 km || 
|-id=411 bgcolor=#E9E9E9
| 270411 ||  || — || February 8, 2002 || Desert Eagle || W. K. Y. Yeung || — || align=right | 2.4 km || 
|-id=412 bgcolor=#E9E9E9
| 270412 ||  || — || February 9, 2002 || Desert Eagle || W. K. Y. Yeung || ADE || align=right | 3.3 km || 
|-id=413 bgcolor=#E9E9E9
| 270413 ||  || — || February 6, 2002 || Socorro || LINEAR || — || align=right | 1.5 km || 
|-id=414 bgcolor=#E9E9E9
| 270414 ||  || — || February 6, 2002 || Socorro || LINEAR || RAF || align=right | 1.3 km || 
|-id=415 bgcolor=#E9E9E9
| 270415 ||  || — || February 4, 2002 || Palomar || NEAT || — || align=right | 2.1 km || 
|-id=416 bgcolor=#E9E9E9
| 270416 ||  || — || February 4, 2002 || Palomar || NEAT || — || align=right | 2.7 km || 
|-id=417 bgcolor=#E9E9E9
| 270417 ||  || — || February 5, 2002 || Palomar || NEAT || ADE || align=right | 3.2 km || 
|-id=418 bgcolor=#E9E9E9
| 270418 ||  || — || February 5, 2002 || Palomar || NEAT || — || align=right | 3.4 km || 
|-id=419 bgcolor=#d6d6d6
| 270419 ||  || — || February 6, 2002 || Palomar || NEAT || — || align=right | 4.5 km || 
|-id=420 bgcolor=#E9E9E9
| 270420 ||  || — || February 7, 2002 || Socorro || LINEAR || — || align=right | 2.8 km || 
|-id=421 bgcolor=#E9E9E9
| 270421 ||  || — || February 7, 2002 || Socorro || LINEAR || — || align=right | 2.3 km || 
|-id=422 bgcolor=#E9E9E9
| 270422 ||  || — || February 5, 2002 || Haleakala || NEAT || — || align=right | 4.2 km || 
|-id=423 bgcolor=#E9E9E9
| 270423 ||  || — || February 6, 2002 || Socorro || LINEAR || — || align=right | 1.9 km || 
|-id=424 bgcolor=#E9E9E9
| 270424 ||  || — || February 6, 2002 || Socorro || LINEAR || — || align=right | 2.5 km || 
|-id=425 bgcolor=#E9E9E9
| 270425 ||  || — || February 6, 2002 || Socorro || LINEAR || — || align=right | 2.1 km || 
|-id=426 bgcolor=#E9E9E9
| 270426 ||  || — || February 7, 2002 || Socorro || LINEAR || — || align=right | 2.0 km || 
|-id=427 bgcolor=#d6d6d6
| 270427 ||  || — || February 7, 2002 || Socorro || LINEAR || — || align=right | 4.3 km || 
|-id=428 bgcolor=#E9E9E9
| 270428 ||  || — || February 7, 2002 || Socorro || LINEAR || — || align=right | 1.8 km || 
|-id=429 bgcolor=#E9E9E9
| 270429 ||  || — || February 7, 2002 || Socorro || LINEAR || DOR || align=right | 3.6 km || 
|-id=430 bgcolor=#E9E9E9
| 270430 ||  || — || February 7, 2002 || Socorro || LINEAR || ADE || align=right | 3.9 km || 
|-id=431 bgcolor=#E9E9E9
| 270431 ||  || — || February 7, 2002 || Socorro || LINEAR || MIS || align=right | 2.7 km || 
|-id=432 bgcolor=#E9E9E9
| 270432 ||  || — || February 7, 2002 || Socorro || LINEAR || — || align=right | 2.0 km || 
|-id=433 bgcolor=#fefefe
| 270433 ||  || — || February 7, 2002 || Socorro || LINEAR || — || align=right | 1.0 km || 
|-id=434 bgcolor=#E9E9E9
| 270434 ||  || — || February 7, 2002 || Socorro || LINEAR || — || align=right | 2.1 km || 
|-id=435 bgcolor=#E9E9E9
| 270435 ||  || — || February 7, 2002 || Socorro || LINEAR || — || align=right | 3.5 km || 
|-id=436 bgcolor=#E9E9E9
| 270436 ||  || — || February 7, 2002 || Socorro || LINEAR || — || align=right | 1.7 km || 
|-id=437 bgcolor=#E9E9E9
| 270437 ||  || — || February 7, 2002 || Socorro || LINEAR || MRX || align=right | 1.6 km || 
|-id=438 bgcolor=#E9E9E9
| 270438 ||  || — || February 8, 2002 || Socorro || LINEAR || JUN || align=right | 1.4 km || 
|-id=439 bgcolor=#E9E9E9
| 270439 ||  || — || February 13, 2002 || Socorro || LINEAR || — || align=right | 3.4 km || 
|-id=440 bgcolor=#E9E9E9
| 270440 ||  || — || February 7, 2002 || Bohyunsan || Y.-B. Jeon, B.-C. Lee || — || align=right | 1.1 km || 
|-id=441 bgcolor=#E9E9E9
| 270441 ||  || — || February 7, 2002 || Socorro || LINEAR || — || align=right | 1.8 km || 
|-id=442 bgcolor=#E9E9E9
| 270442 ||  || — || February 7, 2002 || Socorro || LINEAR || — || align=right | 2.1 km || 
|-id=443 bgcolor=#E9E9E9
| 270443 ||  || — || February 9, 2002 || Socorro || LINEAR || — || align=right | 1.8 km || 
|-id=444 bgcolor=#E9E9E9
| 270444 ||  || — || February 9, 2002 || Socorro || LINEAR || — || align=right | 2.3 km || 
|-id=445 bgcolor=#E9E9E9
| 270445 ||  || — || February 11, 2002 || Kitt Peak || Spacewatch || — || align=right | 3.3 km || 
|-id=446 bgcolor=#E9E9E9
| 270446 ||  || — || February 6, 2002 || Socorro || LINEAR || — || align=right | 3.8 km || 
|-id=447 bgcolor=#E9E9E9
| 270447 ||  || — || February 7, 2002 || Socorro || LINEAR || — || align=right | 2.4 km || 
|-id=448 bgcolor=#E9E9E9
| 270448 ||  || — || February 8, 2002 || Socorro || LINEAR || EUN || align=right | 1.8 km || 
|-id=449 bgcolor=#E9E9E9
| 270449 ||  || — || February 10, 2002 || Socorro || LINEAR || RAF || align=right | 1.7 km || 
|-id=450 bgcolor=#E9E9E9
| 270450 ||  || — || February 10, 2002 || Socorro || LINEAR || — || align=right | 1.4 km || 
|-id=451 bgcolor=#E9E9E9
| 270451 ||  || — || February 10, 2002 || Socorro || LINEAR || NEM || align=right | 2.4 km || 
|-id=452 bgcolor=#E9E9E9
| 270452 ||  || — || February 10, 2002 || Socorro || LINEAR || — || align=right | 1.5 km || 
|-id=453 bgcolor=#E9E9E9
| 270453 ||  || — || February 15, 2002 || Bergisch Gladbac || W. Bickel || NEM || align=right | 2.7 km || 
|-id=454 bgcolor=#E9E9E9
| 270454 ||  || — || February 7, 2002 || Kitt Peak || Spacewatch || — || align=right | 2.4 km || 
|-id=455 bgcolor=#E9E9E9
| 270455 ||  || — || February 10, 2002 || Kitt Peak || Spacewatch || — || align=right | 1.6 km || 
|-id=456 bgcolor=#E9E9E9
| 270456 ||  || — || February 10, 2002 || Socorro || LINEAR || EUN || align=right | 1.9 km || 
|-id=457 bgcolor=#E9E9E9
| 270457 ||  || — || February 15, 2002 || Kitt Peak || Spacewatch || — || align=right | 1.9 km || 
|-id=458 bgcolor=#E9E9E9
| 270458 ||  || — || February 3, 2002 || Haleakala || NEAT || — || align=right | 4.8 km || 
|-id=459 bgcolor=#E9E9E9
| 270459 ||  || — || February 4, 2002 || Palomar || NEAT || — || align=right | 2.6 km || 
|-id=460 bgcolor=#E9E9E9
| 270460 ||  || — || February 7, 2002 || Kitt Peak || Spacewatch || — || align=right | 2.4 km || 
|-id=461 bgcolor=#d6d6d6
| 270461 ||  || — || February 8, 2002 || Palomar || NEAT || BRA || align=right | 2.3 km || 
|-id=462 bgcolor=#E9E9E9
| 270462 ||  || — || February 9, 2002 || Kitt Peak || Spacewatch || NEM || align=right | 2.6 km || 
|-id=463 bgcolor=#E9E9E9
| 270463 ||  || — || February 7, 2002 || Palomar || NEAT || — || align=right | 3.0 km || 
|-id=464 bgcolor=#E9E9E9
| 270464 ||  || — || February 7, 2002 || Palomar || NEAT || — || align=right | 2.5 km || 
|-id=465 bgcolor=#E9E9E9
| 270465 ||  || — || February 10, 2002 || Socorro || LINEAR || — || align=right | 1.5 km || 
|-id=466 bgcolor=#E9E9E9
| 270466 ||  || — || February 8, 2002 || Kitt Peak || Spacewatch || EUN || align=right | 1.5 km || 
|-id=467 bgcolor=#E9E9E9
| 270467 ||  || — || February 10, 2002 || Socorro || LINEAR || JUN || align=right | 1.7 km || 
|-id=468 bgcolor=#E9E9E9
| 270468 ||  || — || February 10, 2002 || Socorro || LINEAR || — || align=right | 1.9 km || 
|-id=469 bgcolor=#d6d6d6
| 270469 ||  || — || February 10, 2002 || Socorro || LINEAR || EOS || align=right | 2.9 km || 
|-id=470 bgcolor=#E9E9E9
| 270470 ||  || — || February 12, 2002 || Socorro || LINEAR || — || align=right | 1.7 km || 
|-id=471 bgcolor=#E9E9E9
| 270471 ||  || — || February 6, 2002 || Palomar || NEAT || JUN || align=right | 1.2 km || 
|-id=472 bgcolor=#E9E9E9
| 270472 Csörgei ||  ||  || February 6, 2002 || Palomar || NEAT || — || align=right | 2.9 km || 
|-id=473 bgcolor=#d6d6d6
| 270473 ||  || — || February 17, 2002 || Cerro Tololo || DLS || — || align=right | 3.1 km || 
|-id=474 bgcolor=#E9E9E9
| 270474 ||  || — || February 16, 2002 || Palomar || NEAT || — || align=right | 1.8 km || 
|-id=475 bgcolor=#E9E9E9
| 270475 ||  || — || February 20, 2002 || Anderson Mesa || LONEOS || — || align=right | 2.5 km || 
|-id=476 bgcolor=#E9E9E9
| 270476 ||  || — || February 16, 2002 || Palomar || NEAT || — || align=right | 4.2 km || 
|-id=477 bgcolor=#E9E9E9
| 270477 ||  || — || March 8, 2002 || Ondřejov || P. Kušnirák, P. Pravec || — || align=right | 2.7 km || 
|-id=478 bgcolor=#E9E9E9
| 270478 ||  || — || March 10, 2002 || Haleakala || NEAT || — || align=right | 1.6 km || 
|-id=479 bgcolor=#E9E9E9
| 270479 ||  || — || March 12, 2002 || Socorro || LINEAR || — || align=right | 1.6 km || 
|-id=480 bgcolor=#E9E9E9
| 270480 ||  || — || March 11, 2002 || Palomar || NEAT || — || align=right | 2.1 km || 
|-id=481 bgcolor=#E9E9E9
| 270481 ||  || — || March 9, 2002 || Socorro || LINEAR || — || align=right | 1.9 km || 
|-id=482 bgcolor=#E9E9E9
| 270482 ||  || — || March 13, 2002 || Socorro || LINEAR || — || align=right | 2.1 km || 
|-id=483 bgcolor=#d6d6d6
| 270483 ||  || — || March 13, 2002 || Socorro || LINEAR || — || align=right | 3.4 km || 
|-id=484 bgcolor=#E9E9E9
| 270484 ||  || — || March 13, 2002 || Socorro || LINEAR || GEF || align=right | 1.8 km || 
|-id=485 bgcolor=#E9E9E9
| 270485 ||  || — || March 13, 2002 || Socorro || LINEAR || ADE || align=right | 3.5 km || 
|-id=486 bgcolor=#E9E9E9
| 270486 ||  || — || March 14, 2002 || Socorro || LINEAR || BRU || align=right | 4.6 km || 
|-id=487 bgcolor=#E9E9E9
| 270487 ||  || — || March 13, 2002 || Palomar || NEAT || — || align=right | 3.1 km || 
|-id=488 bgcolor=#E9E9E9
| 270488 ||  || — || March 9, 2002 || Socorro || LINEAR || — || align=right | 2.5 km || 
|-id=489 bgcolor=#E9E9E9
| 270489 ||  || — || March 14, 2002 || Socorro || LINEAR || ADE || align=right | 2.7 km || 
|-id=490 bgcolor=#E9E9E9
| 270490 ||  || — || February 12, 2002 || Kitt Peak || Spacewatch || — || align=right | 2.3 km || 
|-id=491 bgcolor=#E9E9E9
| 270491 ||  || — || March 10, 2002 || Haleakala || NEAT || — || align=right | 2.7 km || 
|-id=492 bgcolor=#E9E9E9
| 270492 ||  || — || March 13, 2002 || Kitt Peak || Spacewatch || — || align=right | 2.2 km || 
|-id=493 bgcolor=#E9E9E9
| 270493 ||  || — || March 13, 2002 || Kitt Peak || Spacewatch || — || align=right | 2.6 km || 
|-id=494 bgcolor=#E9E9E9
| 270494 ||  || — || March 13, 2002 || Palomar || NEAT || — || align=right | 1.9 km || 
|-id=495 bgcolor=#E9E9E9
| 270495 ||  || — || March 12, 2002 || Palomar || NEAT || — || align=right | 2.1 km || 
|-id=496 bgcolor=#E9E9E9
| 270496 ||  || — || March 12, 2002 || Palomar || NEAT || — || align=right | 2.0 km || 
|-id=497 bgcolor=#E9E9E9
| 270497 ||  || — || March 12, 2002 || Palomar || NEAT || — || align=right | 2.0 km || 
|-id=498 bgcolor=#E9E9E9
| 270498 ||  || — || March 12, 2002 || Palomar || NEAT || — || align=right | 2.7 km || 
|-id=499 bgcolor=#E9E9E9
| 270499 ||  || — || March 14, 2002 || Kitt Peak || Spacewatch || WIT || align=right | 1.3 km || 
|-id=500 bgcolor=#E9E9E9
| 270500 ||  || — || March 19, 1993 || La Silla || UESAC || AEO || align=right | 1.2 km || 
|}

270501–270600 

|-bgcolor=#E9E9E9
| 270501 ||  || — || March 13, 2002 || Kitt Peak || Spacewatch || — || align=right | 3.6 km || 
|-id=502 bgcolor=#E9E9E9
| 270502 ||  || — || March 5, 2002 || Apache Point || SDSS || — || align=right | 2.2 km || 
|-id=503 bgcolor=#E9E9E9
| 270503 ||  || — || March 13, 2002 || Socorro || LINEAR || — || align=right | 2.0 km || 
|-id=504 bgcolor=#C2FFFF
| 270504 ||  || — || March 11, 2002 || Palomar || NEAT || L4 || align=right | 9.3 km || 
|-id=505 bgcolor=#E9E9E9
| 270505 ||  || — || March 10, 2002 || Haleakala || NEAT || — || align=right | 2.2 km || 
|-id=506 bgcolor=#fefefe
| 270506 ||  || — || March 19, 2002 || Desert Eagle || W. K. Y. Yeung || FLO || align=right data-sort-value="0.89" | 890 m || 
|-id=507 bgcolor=#E9E9E9
| 270507 ||  || — || March 16, 2002 || Socorro || LINEAR || JUN || align=right | 1.6 km || 
|-id=508 bgcolor=#E9E9E9
| 270508 ||  || — || March 19, 2002 || Palomar || NEAT || — || align=right | 2.1 km || 
|-id=509 bgcolor=#E9E9E9
| 270509 ||  || — || March 20, 2002 || Socorro || LINEAR || JUN || align=right | 2.7 km || 
|-id=510 bgcolor=#E9E9E9
| 270510 ||  || — || March 20, 2002 || Socorro || LINEAR || — || align=right | 4.1 km || 
|-id=511 bgcolor=#E9E9E9
| 270511 ||  || — || March 20, 2002 || Socorro || LINEAR || — || align=right | 3.3 km || 
|-id=512 bgcolor=#E9E9E9
| 270512 ||  || — || March 20, 2002 || Palomar || NEAT || EUN || align=right | 1.6 km || 
|-id=513 bgcolor=#E9E9E9
| 270513 ||  || — || March 20, 2002 || Anderson Mesa || LONEOS || ADE || align=right | 4.0 km || 
|-id=514 bgcolor=#E9E9E9
| 270514 ||  || — || March 30, 2002 || Palomar || NEAT || — || align=right | 2.3 km || 
|-id=515 bgcolor=#E9E9E9
| 270515 ||  || — || April 15, 2002 || Palomar || NEAT || — || align=right | 3.2 km || 
|-id=516 bgcolor=#E9E9E9
| 270516 ||  || — || April 14, 2002 || Kitt Peak || Spacewatch || MIS || align=right | 3.3 km || 
|-id=517 bgcolor=#E9E9E9
| 270517 ||  || — || April 11, 2002 || Palomar || NEAT || — || align=right | 2.4 km || 
|-id=518 bgcolor=#E9E9E9
| 270518 ||  || — || April 12, 2002 || Haleakala || NEAT || JUN || align=right | 1.4 km || 
|-id=519 bgcolor=#E9E9E9
| 270519 ||  || — || April 7, 2002 || Cerro Tololo || M. W. Buie || MRX || align=right | 1.6 km || 
|-id=520 bgcolor=#E9E9E9
| 270520 ||  || — || April 4, 2002 || Kitt Peak || Spacewatch || GEF || align=right | 1.4 km || 
|-id=521 bgcolor=#E9E9E9
| 270521 ||  || — || April 4, 2002 || Palomar || NEAT || — || align=right | 3.3 km || 
|-id=522 bgcolor=#E9E9E9
| 270522 ||  || — || April 4, 2002 || Palomar || NEAT || — || align=right | 3.5 km || 
|-id=523 bgcolor=#E9E9E9
| 270523 ||  || — || April 5, 2002 || Anderson Mesa || LONEOS || — || align=right | 3.1 km || 
|-id=524 bgcolor=#E9E9E9
| 270524 ||  || — || April 8, 2002 || Palomar || NEAT || — || align=right | 2.9 km || 
|-id=525 bgcolor=#E9E9E9
| 270525 ||  || — || April 8, 2002 || Palomar || NEAT || — || align=right | 3.3 km || 
|-id=526 bgcolor=#E9E9E9
| 270526 ||  || — || April 8, 2002 || Palomar || NEAT || NEM || align=right | 2.9 km || 
|-id=527 bgcolor=#E9E9E9
| 270527 ||  || — || April 8, 2002 || Palomar || NEAT || — || align=right | 2.5 km || 
|-id=528 bgcolor=#E9E9E9
| 270528 ||  || — || April 8, 2002 || Palomar || NEAT || — || align=right | 2.8 km || 
|-id=529 bgcolor=#E9E9E9
| 270529 ||  || — || April 9, 2002 || Socorro || LINEAR || — || align=right | 3.1 km || 
|-id=530 bgcolor=#E9E9E9
| 270530 ||  || — || April 10, 2002 || Palomar || NEAT || — || align=right | 3.1 km || 
|-id=531 bgcolor=#E9E9E9
| 270531 ||  || — || April 10, 2002 || Socorro || LINEAR || HNA || align=right | 3.2 km || 
|-id=532 bgcolor=#E9E9E9
| 270532 ||  || — || April 10, 2002 || Socorro || LINEAR || — || align=right | 3.6 km || 
|-id=533 bgcolor=#E9E9E9
| 270533 ||  || — || April 10, 2002 || Palomar || NEAT || — || align=right | 3.9 km || 
|-id=534 bgcolor=#E9E9E9
| 270534 ||  || — || April 10, 2002 || Socorro || LINEAR || — || align=right | 3.6 km || 
|-id=535 bgcolor=#E9E9E9
| 270535 ||  || — || April 9, 2002 || Kitt Peak || Spacewatch || — || align=right | 2.4 km || 
|-id=536 bgcolor=#E9E9E9
| 270536 ||  || — || April 10, 2002 || Socorro || LINEAR || PAD || align=right | 2.1 km || 
|-id=537 bgcolor=#E9E9E9
| 270537 ||  || — || April 10, 2002 || Socorro || LINEAR || — || align=right | 2.4 km || 
|-id=538 bgcolor=#E9E9E9
| 270538 ||  || — || April 11, 2002 || Socorro || LINEAR || — || align=right | 2.2 km || 
|-id=539 bgcolor=#E9E9E9
| 270539 ||  || — || April 11, 2002 || Socorro || LINEAR || — || align=right | 2.9 km || 
|-id=540 bgcolor=#d6d6d6
| 270540 ||  || — || April 12, 2002 || Palomar || NEAT || — || align=right | 4.5 km || 
|-id=541 bgcolor=#E9E9E9
| 270541 ||  || — || April 10, 2002 || Socorro || LINEAR || — || align=right | 2.3 km || 
|-id=542 bgcolor=#fefefe
| 270542 ||  || — || April 12, 2002 || Socorro || LINEAR || — || align=right data-sort-value="0.89" | 890 m || 
|-id=543 bgcolor=#E9E9E9
| 270543 ||  || — || April 12, 2002 || Socorro || LINEAR || — || align=right | 3.5 km || 
|-id=544 bgcolor=#E9E9E9
| 270544 ||  || — || April 12, 2002 || Socorro || LINEAR || — || align=right | 3.1 km || 
|-id=545 bgcolor=#E9E9E9
| 270545 ||  || — || April 12, 2002 || Socorro || LINEAR || — || align=right | 2.5 km || 
|-id=546 bgcolor=#d6d6d6
| 270546 ||  || — || April 13, 2002 || Kitt Peak || Spacewatch || — || align=right | 2.6 km || 
|-id=547 bgcolor=#E9E9E9
| 270547 ||  || — || April 12, 2002 || Palomar || NEAT || — || align=right | 2.9 km || 
|-id=548 bgcolor=#E9E9E9
| 270548 ||  || — || April 15, 2002 || Anderson Mesa || LONEOS || — || align=right | 2.8 km || 
|-id=549 bgcolor=#E9E9E9
| 270549 ||  || — || April 14, 2002 || Palomar || NEAT || — || align=right | 2.6 km || 
|-id=550 bgcolor=#d6d6d6
| 270550 ||  || — || April 15, 2002 || Palomar || NEAT || — || align=right | 4.5 km || 
|-id=551 bgcolor=#E9E9E9
| 270551 ||  || — || April 12, 2002 || Palomar || NEAT || — || align=right | 3.9 km || 
|-id=552 bgcolor=#E9E9E9
| 270552 ||  || — || April 10, 2002 || Socorro || LINEAR || — || align=right | 2.9 km || 
|-id=553 bgcolor=#E9E9E9
| 270553 Loureed ||  ||  || April 12, 2002 || Palomar || M. Meyer || WIT || align=right | 1.5 km || 
|-id=554 bgcolor=#E9E9E9
| 270554 ||  || — || April 11, 2002 || Palomar || NEAT || — || align=right | 3.4 km || 
|-id=555 bgcolor=#E9E9E9
| 270555 ||  || — || April 8, 2002 || Palomar || NEAT || — || align=right | 2.5 km || 
|-id=556 bgcolor=#E9E9E9
| 270556 Kolonica ||  ||  || April 9, 2002 || Palomar || NEAT || XIZ || align=right | 1.5 km || 
|-id=557 bgcolor=#E9E9E9
| 270557 ||  || — || April 9, 2002 || Palomar || NEAT || — || align=right | 2.3 km || 
|-id=558 bgcolor=#E9E9E9
| 270558 ||  || — || April 9, 2002 || Palomar || NEAT || — || align=right | 2.7 km || 
|-id=559 bgcolor=#d6d6d6
| 270559 ||  || — || April 9, 2002 || Palomar || NEAT || HYG || align=right | 3.6 km || 
|-id=560 bgcolor=#E9E9E9
| 270560 ||  || — || April 8, 2002 || Palomar || NEAT || — || align=right | 3.0 km || 
|-id=561 bgcolor=#E9E9E9
| 270561 ||  || — || April 13, 2002 || Palomar || NEAT || WIT || align=right | 1.4 km || 
|-id=562 bgcolor=#E9E9E9
| 270562 ||  || — || April 9, 2002 || Palomar || NEAT || HOF || align=right | 3.1 km || 
|-id=563 bgcolor=#E9E9E9
| 270563 ||  || — || April 19, 2002 || Kitt Peak || Spacewatch || DOR || align=right | 4.1 km || 
|-id=564 bgcolor=#E9E9E9
| 270564 ||  || — || April 17, 2002 || Socorro || LINEAR || — || align=right | 3.0 km || 
|-id=565 bgcolor=#E9E9E9
| 270565 ||  || — || April 20, 2002 || Palomar || NEAT || — || align=right | 3.8 km || 
|-id=566 bgcolor=#E9E9E9
| 270566 ||  || — || May 3, 2002 || Palomar || NEAT || HNA || align=right | 3.4 km || 
|-id=567 bgcolor=#d6d6d6
| 270567 ||  || — || May 7, 2002 || Palomar || NEAT || — || align=right | 4.4 km || 
|-id=568 bgcolor=#E9E9E9
| 270568 ||  || — || May 7, 2002 || Palomar || NEAT || — || align=right | 2.5 km || 
|-id=569 bgcolor=#E9E9E9
| 270569 ||  || — || May 8, 2002 || Socorro || LINEAR || AEO || align=right | 1.8 km || 
|-id=570 bgcolor=#E9E9E9
| 270570 ||  || — || May 8, 2002 || Socorro || LINEAR || — || align=right | 3.2 km || 
|-id=571 bgcolor=#E9E9E9
| 270571 ||  || — || May 6, 2002 || Socorro || LINEAR || — || align=right | 3.4 km || 
|-id=572 bgcolor=#E9E9E9
| 270572 ||  || — || May 7, 2002 || Socorro || LINEAR || — || align=right | 4.3 km || 
|-id=573 bgcolor=#E9E9E9
| 270573 ||  || — || May 11, 2002 || Socorro || LINEAR || EUN || align=right | 1.8 km || 
|-id=574 bgcolor=#fefefe
| 270574 ||  || — || May 11, 2002 || Socorro || LINEAR || — || align=right | 1.2 km || 
|-id=575 bgcolor=#fefefe
| 270575 ||  || — || May 11, 2002 || Socorro || LINEAR || FLO || align=right data-sort-value="0.89" | 890 m || 
|-id=576 bgcolor=#E9E9E9
| 270576 ||  || — || May 11, 2002 || Socorro || LINEAR || — || align=right | 2.8 km || 
|-id=577 bgcolor=#fefefe
| 270577 ||  || — || May 11, 2002 || Socorro || LINEAR || FLO || align=right data-sort-value="0.64" | 640 m || 
|-id=578 bgcolor=#E9E9E9
| 270578 ||  || — || May 11, 2002 || Socorro || LINEAR || — || align=right | 2.9 km || 
|-id=579 bgcolor=#E9E9E9
| 270579 ||  || — || May 13, 2002 || Palomar || NEAT || EUN || align=right | 2.1 km || 
|-id=580 bgcolor=#E9E9E9
| 270580 ||  || — || May 15, 2002 || Palomar || NEAT || — || align=right | 3.6 km || 
|-id=581 bgcolor=#E9E9E9
| 270581 ||  || — || May 9, 2002 || Palomar || NEAT || — || align=right | 2.9 km || 
|-id=582 bgcolor=#E9E9E9
| 270582 ||  || — || May 13, 2002 || Palomar || NEAT || — || align=right | 3.9 km || 
|-id=583 bgcolor=#E9E9E9
| 270583 ||  || — || May 14, 2002 || Anderson Mesa || LONEOS || — || align=right | 2.5 km || 
|-id=584 bgcolor=#E9E9E9
| 270584 Vlasta ||  ||  || May 7, 2002 || Palomar || NEAT || — || align=right | 2.3 km || 
|-id=585 bgcolor=#E9E9E9
| 270585 ||  || — || May 16, 2002 || Socorro || LINEAR || TIN || align=right | 1.1 km || 
|-id=586 bgcolor=#E9E9E9
| 270586 ||  || — || May 18, 2002 || Palomar || NEAT || — || align=right | 2.9 km || 
|-id=587 bgcolor=#E9E9E9
| 270587 ||  || — || June 2, 2002 || Palomar || NEAT || DOR || align=right | 4.3 km || 
|-id=588 bgcolor=#FA8072
| 270588 ||  || — || June 7, 2002 || Haleakala || NEAT || — || align=right | 1.1 km || 
|-id=589 bgcolor=#d6d6d6
| 270589 ||  || — || June 5, 2002 || Socorro || LINEAR || — || align=right | 3.4 km || 
|-id=590 bgcolor=#E9E9E9
| 270590 ||  || — || June 8, 2002 || Socorro || LINEAR || — || align=right | 2.9 km || 
|-id=591 bgcolor=#E9E9E9
| 270591 ||  || — || June 10, 2002 || Socorro || LINEAR || DOR || align=right | 3.0 km || 
|-id=592 bgcolor=#E9E9E9
| 270592 ||  || — || June 10, 2002 || Palomar || NEAT || — || align=right | 4.2 km || 
|-id=593 bgcolor=#E9E9E9
| 270593 ||  || — || June 7, 2002 || Haleakala || NEAT || — || align=right | 3.9 km || 
|-id=594 bgcolor=#E9E9E9
| 270594 ||  || — || June 9, 2002 || Socorro || LINEAR || — || align=right | 4.3 km || 
|-id=595 bgcolor=#fefefe
| 270595 ||  || — || June 3, 2002 || Palomar || NEAT || FLO || align=right data-sort-value="0.64" | 640 m || 
|-id=596 bgcolor=#d6d6d6
| 270596 ||  || — || July 5, 2002 || Socorro || LINEAR || — || align=right | 4.5 km || 
|-id=597 bgcolor=#d6d6d6
| 270597 ||  || — || July 7, 2002 || Needville || Needville Obs. || — || align=right | 3.7 km || 
|-id=598 bgcolor=#fefefe
| 270598 ||  || — || July 9, 2002 || Socorro || LINEAR || — || align=right data-sort-value="0.95" | 950 m || 
|-id=599 bgcolor=#d6d6d6
| 270599 ||  || — || July 9, 2002 || Socorro || LINEAR || TEL || align=right | 2.5 km || 
|-id=600 bgcolor=#d6d6d6
| 270600 ||  || — || July 12, 2002 || Palomar || NEAT || — || align=right | 3.3 km || 
|}

270601–270700 

|-bgcolor=#d6d6d6
| 270601 Frauenstein ||  ||  || July 14, 2002 || Palomar || M. Meyer || — || align=right | 2.6 km || 
|-id=602 bgcolor=#d6d6d6
| 270602 ||  || — || July 8, 2002 || Palomar || NEAT || EOS || align=right | 2.8 km || 
|-id=603 bgcolor=#fefefe
| 270603 ||  || — || July 5, 2002 || Palomar || NEAT || — || align=right data-sort-value="0.88" | 880 m || 
|-id=604 bgcolor=#d6d6d6
| 270604 ||  || — || July 14, 2002 || Palomar || NEAT || — || align=right | 3.6 km || 
|-id=605 bgcolor=#fefefe
| 270605 ||  || — || July 9, 2002 || Palomar || NEAT || — || align=right data-sort-value="0.90" | 900 m || 
|-id=606 bgcolor=#d6d6d6
| 270606 ||  || — || July 12, 2002 || Palomar || NEAT || — || align=right | 4.0 km || 
|-id=607 bgcolor=#d6d6d6
| 270607 ||  || — || July 8, 2002 || Palomar || NEAT || — || align=right | 3.1 km || 
|-id=608 bgcolor=#d6d6d6
| 270608 ||  || — || July 12, 2002 || Palomar || NEAT || EOS || align=right | 2.4 km || 
|-id=609 bgcolor=#fefefe
| 270609 ||  || — || July 14, 2002 || Palomar || NEAT || — || align=right data-sort-value="0.79" | 790 m || 
|-id=610 bgcolor=#d6d6d6
| 270610 ||  || — || July 27, 2002 || Palomar || NEAT || — || align=right | 5.7 km || 
|-id=611 bgcolor=#d6d6d6
| 270611 ||  || — || July 31, 2002 || Powell || Powell Obs. || — || align=right | 3.4 km || 
|-id=612 bgcolor=#d6d6d6
| 270612 ||  || — || July 30, 2002 || Haleakala || NEAT || — || align=right | 4.9 km || 
|-id=613 bgcolor=#d6d6d6
| 270613 ||  || — || July 22, 2002 || Palomar || NEAT || — || align=right | 2.3 km || 
|-id=614 bgcolor=#d6d6d6
| 270614 ||  || — || July 21, 2002 || Palomar || NEAT || TRP || align=right | 3.1 km || 
|-id=615 bgcolor=#d6d6d6
| 270615 ||  || — || January 16, 2005 || Kitt Peak || Spacewatch || — || align=right | 3.9 km || 
|-id=616 bgcolor=#d6d6d6
| 270616 ||  || — || August 3, 2002 || Palomar || NEAT || — || align=right | 4.5 km || 
|-id=617 bgcolor=#d6d6d6
| 270617 ||  || — || August 5, 2002 || Palomar || NEAT || — || align=right | 2.8 km || 
|-id=618 bgcolor=#fefefe
| 270618 ||  || — || August 6, 2002 || Palomar || NEAT || FLO || align=right data-sort-value="0.67" | 670 m || 
|-id=619 bgcolor=#d6d6d6
| 270619 ||  || — || August 6, 2002 || Palomar || NEAT || EMA || align=right | 5.1 km || 
|-id=620 bgcolor=#fefefe
| 270620 ||  || — || August 6, 2002 || Palomar || NEAT || — || align=right data-sort-value="0.94" | 940 m || 
|-id=621 bgcolor=#d6d6d6
| 270621 ||  || — || August 6, 2002 || Palomar || NEAT || — || align=right | 3.7 km || 
|-id=622 bgcolor=#fefefe
| 270622 ||  || — || August 6, 2002 || Palomar || NEAT || — || align=right | 1.0 km || 
|-id=623 bgcolor=#d6d6d6
| 270623 ||  || — || August 6, 2002 || Palomar || NEAT || EOS || align=right | 2.4 km || 
|-id=624 bgcolor=#d6d6d6
| 270624 ||  || — || August 6, 2002 || Palomar || NEAT || — || align=right | 6.1 km || 
|-id=625 bgcolor=#d6d6d6
| 270625 ||  || — || August 6, 2002 || Palomar || NEAT || EOS || align=right | 2.9 km || 
|-id=626 bgcolor=#d6d6d6
| 270626 ||  || — || August 6, 2002 || Campo Imperatore || CINEOS || — || align=right | 4.2 km || 
|-id=627 bgcolor=#fefefe
| 270627 ||  || — || August 7, 2002 || Reedy Creek || J. Broughton || — || align=right | 1.2 km || 
|-id=628 bgcolor=#fefefe
| 270628 ||  || — || August 5, 2002 || Campo Imperatore || CINEOS || — || align=right data-sort-value="0.91" | 910 m || 
|-id=629 bgcolor=#d6d6d6
| 270629 ||  || — || August 5, 2002 || Campo Imperatore || CINEOS || — || align=right | 3.4 km || 
|-id=630 bgcolor=#d6d6d6
| 270630 ||  || — || August 7, 2002 || Palomar || NEAT || EOS || align=right | 2.6 km || 
|-id=631 bgcolor=#d6d6d6
| 270631 ||  || — || August 11, 2002 || Socorro || LINEAR || — || align=right | 3.4 km || 
|-id=632 bgcolor=#d6d6d6
| 270632 ||  || — || August 5, 2002 || Palomar || NEAT || — || align=right | 3.0 km || 
|-id=633 bgcolor=#d6d6d6
| 270633 ||  || — || August 11, 2002 || Socorro || LINEAR || — || align=right | 4.5 km || 
|-id=634 bgcolor=#d6d6d6
| 270634 ||  || — || August 12, 2002 || Socorro || LINEAR || — || align=right | 3.7 km || 
|-id=635 bgcolor=#d6d6d6
| 270635 ||  || — || August 12, 2002 || Socorro || LINEAR || — || align=right | 3.7 km || 
|-id=636 bgcolor=#d6d6d6
| 270636 ||  || — || August 8, 2002 || Palomar || NEAT || EOS || align=right | 2.3 km || 
|-id=637 bgcolor=#fefefe
| 270637 ||  || — || August 11, 2002 || Palomar || NEAT || — || align=right data-sort-value="0.86" | 860 m || 
|-id=638 bgcolor=#fefefe
| 270638 ||  || — || August 11, 2002 || Palomar || NEAT || FLO || align=right data-sort-value="0.97" | 970 m || 
|-id=639 bgcolor=#d6d6d6
| 270639 ||  || — || August 11, 2002 || Palomar || NEAT || — || align=right | 5.9 km || 
|-id=640 bgcolor=#d6d6d6
| 270640 ||  || — || August 12, 2002 || Haleakala || NEAT || — || align=right | 3.5 km || 
|-id=641 bgcolor=#fefefe
| 270641 ||  || — || August 14, 2002 || Socorro || LINEAR || — || align=right | 1.1 km || 
|-id=642 bgcolor=#fefefe
| 270642 ||  || — || August 12, 2002 || Socorro || LINEAR || — || align=right data-sort-value="0.98" | 980 m || 
|-id=643 bgcolor=#d6d6d6
| 270643 ||  || — || August 13, 2002 || Palomar || NEAT || EOS || align=right | 2.4 km || 
|-id=644 bgcolor=#d6d6d6
| 270644 ||  || — || August 5, 2002 || Palomar || NEAT || — || align=right | 4.8 km || 
|-id=645 bgcolor=#d6d6d6
| 270645 ||  || — || August 11, 2002 || Socorro || LINEAR || — || align=right | 4.7 km || 
|-id=646 bgcolor=#fefefe
| 270646 ||  || — || August 13, 2002 || Anderson Mesa || LONEOS || — || align=right data-sort-value="0.98" | 980 m || 
|-id=647 bgcolor=#d6d6d6
| 270647 ||  || — || August 14, 2002 || Socorro || LINEAR || EOS || align=right | 2.6 km || 
|-id=648 bgcolor=#d6d6d6
| 270648 ||  || — || August 13, 2002 || Socorro || LINEAR || — || align=right | 3.7 km || 
|-id=649 bgcolor=#d6d6d6
| 270649 ||  || — || August 14, 2002 || Bergisch Gladbac || W. Bickel || — || align=right | 3.3 km || 
|-id=650 bgcolor=#d6d6d6
| 270650 ||  || — || August 9, 2002 || Cerro Tololo || M. W. Buie || EOS || align=right | 4.4 km || 
|-id=651 bgcolor=#d6d6d6
| 270651 ||  || — || August 8, 2002 || Palomar || S. F. Hönig || — || align=right | 2.7 km || 
|-id=652 bgcolor=#d6d6d6
| 270652 ||  || — || August 8, 2002 || Palomar || S. F. Hönig || EOS || align=right | 2.6 km || 
|-id=653 bgcolor=#d6d6d6
| 270653 ||  || — || August 8, 2002 || Palomar || S. F. Hönig || — || align=right | 3.3 km || 
|-id=654 bgcolor=#d6d6d6
| 270654 ||  || — || August 8, 2002 || Palomar || A. Lowe || HYG || align=right | 3.1 km || 
|-id=655 bgcolor=#d6d6d6
| 270655 ||  || — || August 11, 2002 || Needville || Needville Obs. || — || align=right | 4.1 km || 
|-id=656 bgcolor=#d6d6d6
| 270656 ||  || — || August 11, 2002 || Palomar || NEAT || — || align=right | 4.7 km || 
|-id=657 bgcolor=#d6d6d6
| 270657 ||  || — || August 8, 2002 || Palomar || NEAT || EOS || align=right | 2.7 km || 
|-id=658 bgcolor=#fefefe
| 270658 ||  || — || August 8, 2002 || Palomar || NEAT || — || align=right data-sort-value="0.89" | 890 m || 
|-id=659 bgcolor=#FA8072
| 270659 ||  || — || August 13, 2002 || Palomar || NEAT || — || align=right data-sort-value="0.71" | 710 m || 
|-id=660 bgcolor=#d6d6d6
| 270660 ||  || — || August 13, 2002 || Palomar || NEAT || — || align=right | 3.9 km || 
|-id=661 bgcolor=#d6d6d6
| 270661 ||  || — || August 13, 2002 || Anderson Mesa || LONEOS || — || align=right | 5.4 km || 
|-id=662 bgcolor=#d6d6d6
| 270662 ||  || — || August 11, 2002 || Palomar || NEAT || TEL || align=right | 2.0 km || 
|-id=663 bgcolor=#fefefe
| 270663 ||  || — || August 8, 2002 || Palomar || NEAT || — || align=right data-sort-value="0.81" | 810 m || 
|-id=664 bgcolor=#d6d6d6
| 270664 ||  || — || August 14, 2002 || Palomar || NEAT || — || align=right | 4.0 km || 
|-id=665 bgcolor=#fefefe
| 270665 ||  || — || August 7, 2002 || Palomar || NEAT || — || align=right data-sort-value="0.96" | 960 m || 
|-id=666 bgcolor=#d6d6d6
| 270666 ||  || — || August 8, 2002 || Palomar || NEAT || URS || align=right | 3.6 km || 
|-id=667 bgcolor=#d6d6d6
| 270667 ||  || — || August 13, 2002 || Palomar || NEAT || — || align=right | 7.7 km || 
|-id=668 bgcolor=#d6d6d6
| 270668 ||  || — || August 15, 2002 || Palomar || NEAT || — || align=right | 3.3 km || 
|-id=669 bgcolor=#d6d6d6
| 270669 ||  || — || August 12, 2002 || Haleakala || NEAT || EOS || align=right | 3.0 km || 
|-id=670 bgcolor=#d6d6d6
| 270670 ||  || — || July 18, 2007 || Mount Lemmon || Mount Lemmon Survey || CHA || align=right | 2.0 km || 
|-id=671 bgcolor=#d6d6d6
| 270671 ||  || — || August 16, 2002 || Kitt Peak || Spacewatch || — || align=right | 2.8 km || 
|-id=672 bgcolor=#d6d6d6
| 270672 ||  || — || August 16, 2002 || Socorro || LINEAR || EUP || align=right | 6.2 km || 
|-id=673 bgcolor=#d6d6d6
| 270673 ||  || — || August 19, 2002 || Palomar || NEAT || — || align=right | 4.2 km || 
|-id=674 bgcolor=#fefefe
| 270674 ||  || — || August 20, 2002 || Palomar || NEAT || — || align=right data-sort-value="0.99" | 990 m || 
|-id=675 bgcolor=#d6d6d6
| 270675 ||  || — || August 19, 2002 || Kvistaberg || UDAS || — || align=right | 3.6 km || 
|-id=676 bgcolor=#d6d6d6
| 270676 ||  || — || August 29, 2002 || Kitt Peak || Spacewatch || — || align=right | 2.6 km || 
|-id=677 bgcolor=#d6d6d6
| 270677 ||  || — || August 29, 2002 || Palomar || NEAT || EOS || align=right | 2.4 km || 
|-id=678 bgcolor=#fefefe
| 270678 ||  || — || August 29, 2002 || Palomar || NEAT || — || align=right | 1.2 km || 
|-id=679 bgcolor=#d6d6d6
| 270679 ||  || — || August 29, 2002 || Palomar || NEAT || EOS || align=right | 2.5 km || 
|-id=680 bgcolor=#d6d6d6
| 270680 ||  || — || August 29, 2002 || Palomar || NEAT || — || align=right | 4.9 km || 
|-id=681 bgcolor=#fefefe
| 270681 ||  || — || August 30, 2002 || Kitt Peak || Spacewatch || — || align=right | 1.0 km || 
|-id=682 bgcolor=#d6d6d6
| 270682 ||  || — || August 30, 2002 || Kitt Peak || Spacewatch || — || align=right | 3.5 km || 
|-id=683 bgcolor=#d6d6d6
| 270683 ||  || — || August 30, 2002 || Kitt Peak || Spacewatch || — || align=right | 4.8 km || 
|-id=684 bgcolor=#d6d6d6
| 270684 ||  || — || August 30, 2002 || Kitt Peak || Spacewatch || — || align=right | 2.7 km || 
|-id=685 bgcolor=#d6d6d6
| 270685 ||  || — || August 27, 2002 || Palomar || NEAT || EUP || align=right | 5.3 km || 
|-id=686 bgcolor=#d6d6d6
| 270686 ||  || — || August 30, 2002 || Kitt Peak || Spacewatch || — || align=right | 3.6 km || 
|-id=687 bgcolor=#d6d6d6
| 270687 ||  || — || August 30, 2002 || Anderson Mesa || LONEOS || — || align=right | 4.7 km || 
|-id=688 bgcolor=#d6d6d6
| 270688 ||  || — || August 18, 2002 || Palomar || S. F. Hönig || — || align=right | 3.8 km || 
|-id=689 bgcolor=#d6d6d6
| 270689 ||  || — || August 29, 2002 || Palomar || S. F. Hönig || — || align=right | 3.4 km || 
|-id=690 bgcolor=#fefefe
| 270690 ||  || — || August 29, 2002 || Palomar || S. F. Hönig || V || align=right data-sort-value="0.93" | 930 m || 
|-id=691 bgcolor=#fefefe
| 270691 ||  || — || August 29, 2002 || Palomar || S. F. Hönig || MAS || align=right data-sort-value="0.90" | 900 m || 
|-id=692 bgcolor=#fefefe
| 270692 ||  || — || August 29, 2002 || Palomar || S. F. Hönig || — || align=right data-sort-value="0.72" | 720 m || 
|-id=693 bgcolor=#d6d6d6
| 270693 ||  || — || August 29, 2002 || Palomar || S. F. Hönig || — || align=right | 3.7 km || 
|-id=694 bgcolor=#d6d6d6
| 270694 ||  || — || August 16, 2002 || Palomar || NEAT || — || align=right | 3.2 km || 
|-id=695 bgcolor=#d6d6d6
| 270695 ||  || — || August 16, 2002 || Palomar || NEAT || — || align=right | 2.8 km || 
|-id=696 bgcolor=#d6d6d6
| 270696 ||  || — || August 30, 2002 || Palomar || NEAT || EOS || align=right | 2.2 km || 
|-id=697 bgcolor=#d6d6d6
| 270697 ||  || — || August 16, 2002 || Haleakala || NEAT || — || align=right | 4.6 km || 
|-id=698 bgcolor=#fefefe
| 270698 ||  || — || August 28, 2002 || Palomar || NEAT || — || align=right data-sort-value="0.75" | 750 m || 
|-id=699 bgcolor=#d6d6d6
| 270699 ||  || — || August 27, 2002 || Palomar || NEAT || — || align=right | 2.7 km || 
|-id=700 bgcolor=#d6d6d6
| 270700 ||  || — || August 29, 2002 || Palomar || NEAT || — || align=right | 3.0 km || 
|}

270701–270800 

|-bgcolor=#d6d6d6
| 270701 ||  || — || August 18, 2002 || Palomar || NEAT || — || align=right | 2.8 km || 
|-id=702 bgcolor=#d6d6d6
| 270702 ||  || — || August 26, 2002 || Palomar || NEAT || — || align=right | 5.1 km || 
|-id=703 bgcolor=#d6d6d6
| 270703 ||  || — || August 28, 2002 || Palomar || NEAT || — || align=right | 3.3 km || 
|-id=704 bgcolor=#d6d6d6
| 270704 ||  || — || August 17, 2002 || Palomar || NEAT || — || align=right | 3.1 km || 
|-id=705 bgcolor=#d6d6d6
| 270705 ||  || — || August 16, 2002 || Palomar || NEAT || EOS || align=right | 4.3 km || 
|-id=706 bgcolor=#d6d6d6
| 270706 ||  || — || August 17, 2002 || Palomar || NEAT || — || align=right | 3.5 km || 
|-id=707 bgcolor=#d6d6d6
| 270707 ||  || — || August 27, 2002 || Palomar || NEAT || — || align=right | 4.1 km || 
|-id=708 bgcolor=#d6d6d6
| 270708 ||  || — || August 29, 2002 || Palomar || NEAT || — || align=right | 3.2 km || 
|-id=709 bgcolor=#d6d6d6
| 270709 ||  || — || August 19, 2002 || Palomar || NEAT || EOS || align=right | 5.2 km || 
|-id=710 bgcolor=#d6d6d6
| 270710 ||  || — || August 29, 2002 || Palomar || NEAT || — || align=right | 4.1 km || 
|-id=711 bgcolor=#d6d6d6
| 270711 ||  || — || August 18, 2002 || Palomar || NEAT || EOS || align=right | 2.5 km || 
|-id=712 bgcolor=#d6d6d6
| 270712 ||  || — || August 18, 2002 || Palomar || NEAT || THM || align=right | 2.5 km || 
|-id=713 bgcolor=#d6d6d6
| 270713 ||  || — || August 18, 2002 || Palomar || NEAT || — || align=right | 3.5 km || 
|-id=714 bgcolor=#d6d6d6
| 270714 ||  || — || August 26, 2002 || Palomar || NEAT || — || align=right | 4.1 km || 
|-id=715 bgcolor=#fefefe
| 270715 ||  || — || August 26, 2002 || Palomar || NEAT || FLO || align=right data-sort-value="0.81" | 810 m || 
|-id=716 bgcolor=#d6d6d6
| 270716 ||  || — || August 17, 2002 || Palomar || NEAT || THM || align=right | 2.4 km || 
|-id=717 bgcolor=#fefefe
| 270717 ||  || — || August 17, 2002 || Palomar || NEAT || V || align=right data-sort-value="0.82" | 820 m || 
|-id=718 bgcolor=#d6d6d6
| 270718 ||  || — || August 27, 2002 || Palomar || NEAT || — || align=right | 3.7 km || 
|-id=719 bgcolor=#fefefe
| 270719 ||  || — || August 27, 2002 || Palomar || NEAT || FLO || align=right data-sort-value="0.70" | 700 m || 
|-id=720 bgcolor=#d6d6d6
| 270720 ||  || — || August 27, 2002 || Palomar || NEAT || — || align=right | 4.8 km || 
|-id=721 bgcolor=#d6d6d6
| 270721 ||  || — || August 27, 2002 || Palomar || NEAT || — || align=right | 3.7 km || 
|-id=722 bgcolor=#d6d6d6
| 270722 ||  || — || August 19, 2002 || Palomar || NEAT || — || align=right | 3.6 km || 
|-id=723 bgcolor=#d6d6d6
| 270723 ||  || — || August 18, 2002 || Palomar || NEAT || CRO || align=right | 3.2 km || 
|-id=724 bgcolor=#fefefe
| 270724 ||  || — || August 26, 2002 || Palomar || NEAT || FLO || align=right data-sort-value="0.62" | 620 m || 
|-id=725 bgcolor=#d6d6d6
| 270725 Evka ||  ||  || August 20, 2002 || Palomar || NEAT || — || align=right | 3.5 km || 
|-id=726 bgcolor=#d6d6d6
| 270726 ||  || — || August 28, 2002 || Palomar || NEAT || — || align=right | 4.0 km || 
|-id=727 bgcolor=#fefefe
| 270727 ||  || — || August 30, 2002 || Palomar || NEAT || — || align=right | 1.0 km || 
|-id=728 bgcolor=#d6d6d6
| 270728 ||  || — || August 29, 2002 || Palomar || NEAT || — || align=right | 2.7 km || 
|-id=729 bgcolor=#d6d6d6
| 270729 ||  || — || August 18, 2002 || Palomar || NEAT || — || align=right | 4.9 km || 
|-id=730 bgcolor=#d6d6d6
| 270730 ||  || — || August 17, 2002 || Palomar || NEAT || — || align=right | 2.5 km || 
|-id=731 bgcolor=#fefefe
| 270731 ||  || — || August 30, 2002 || Palomar || NEAT || V || align=right data-sort-value="0.68" | 680 m || 
|-id=732 bgcolor=#d6d6d6
| 270732 ||  || — || August 16, 2002 || Palomar || NEAT || — || align=right | 3.3 km || 
|-id=733 bgcolor=#d6d6d6
| 270733 ||  || — || August 30, 2002 || Palomar || NEAT || — || align=right | 3.0 km || 
|-id=734 bgcolor=#E9E9E9
| 270734 ||  || — || September 14, 2007 || Mount Lemmon || Mount Lemmon Survey || — || align=right | 1.8 km || 
|-id=735 bgcolor=#d6d6d6
| 270735 ||  || — || March 11, 2005 || Mount Lemmon || Mount Lemmon Survey || — || align=right | 3.6 km || 
|-id=736 bgcolor=#E9E9E9
| 270736 ||  || — || November 2, 2007 || Mount Lemmon || Mount Lemmon Survey || — || align=right | 1.6 km || 
|-id=737 bgcolor=#d6d6d6
| 270737 ||  || — || October 2, 1997 || Kitt Peak || Spacewatch || HYG || align=right | 2.8 km || 
|-id=738 bgcolor=#fefefe
| 270738 ||  || — || September 4, 2002 || Palomar || NEAT || FLO || align=right data-sort-value="0.78" | 780 m || 
|-id=739 bgcolor=#fefefe
| 270739 ||  || — || September 4, 2002 || Palomar || NEAT || V || align=right data-sort-value="0.79" | 790 m || 
|-id=740 bgcolor=#fefefe
| 270740 ||  || — || September 4, 2002 || Anderson Mesa || LONEOS || — || align=right | 1.1 km || 
|-id=741 bgcolor=#d6d6d6
| 270741 ||  || — || September 4, 2002 || Anderson Mesa || LONEOS || EMA || align=right | 5.2 km || 
|-id=742 bgcolor=#fefefe
| 270742 ||  || — || September 6, 2002 || Socorro || LINEAR || — || align=right | 1.1 km || 
|-id=743 bgcolor=#fefefe
| 270743 ||  || — || September 4, 2002 || Anderson Mesa || LONEOS || — || align=right | 1.2 km || 
|-id=744 bgcolor=#d6d6d6
| 270744 ||  || — || September 5, 2002 || Anderson Mesa || LONEOS || — || align=right | 4.3 km || 
|-id=745 bgcolor=#d6d6d6
| 270745 ||  || — || September 5, 2002 || Socorro || LINEAR || EOS || align=right | 5.8 km || 
|-id=746 bgcolor=#fefefe
| 270746 ||  || — || September 5, 2002 || Socorro || LINEAR || ERI || align=right | 1.8 km || 
|-id=747 bgcolor=#d6d6d6
| 270747 ||  || — || September 5, 2002 || Socorro || LINEAR || — || align=right | 4.6 km || 
|-id=748 bgcolor=#d6d6d6
| 270748 ||  || — || September 5, 2002 || Anderson Mesa || LONEOS || — || align=right | 3.5 km || 
|-id=749 bgcolor=#d6d6d6
| 270749 ||  || — || September 5, 2002 || Socorro || LINEAR || — || align=right | 5.6 km || 
|-id=750 bgcolor=#fefefe
| 270750 ||  || — || September 5, 2002 || Anderson Mesa || LONEOS || FLO || align=right data-sort-value="0.98" | 980 m || 
|-id=751 bgcolor=#fefefe
| 270751 ||  || — || September 5, 2002 || Socorro || LINEAR || — || align=right | 1.0 km || 
|-id=752 bgcolor=#fefefe
| 270752 ||  || — || September 5, 2002 || Anderson Mesa || LONEOS || FLO || align=right data-sort-value="0.85" | 850 m || 
|-id=753 bgcolor=#fefefe
| 270753 ||  || — || September 5, 2002 || Socorro || LINEAR || FLO || align=right data-sort-value="0.91" | 910 m || 
|-id=754 bgcolor=#fefefe
| 270754 ||  || — || September 5, 2002 || Socorro || LINEAR || — || align=right | 1.7 km || 
|-id=755 bgcolor=#fefefe
| 270755 ||  || — || September 4, 2002 || Anderson Mesa || LONEOS || — || align=right data-sort-value="0.94" | 940 m || 
|-id=756 bgcolor=#d6d6d6
| 270756 ||  || — || September 5, 2002 || Socorro || LINEAR || HYG || align=right | 3.7 km || 
|-id=757 bgcolor=#fefefe
| 270757 ||  || — || September 5, 2002 || Socorro || LINEAR || — || align=right | 1.0 km || 
|-id=758 bgcolor=#fefefe
| 270758 ||  || — || September 5, 2002 || Socorro || LINEAR || FLO || align=right data-sort-value="0.86" | 860 m || 
|-id=759 bgcolor=#d6d6d6
| 270759 ||  || — || September 5, 2002 || Socorro || LINEAR || — || align=right | 5.2 km || 
|-id=760 bgcolor=#fefefe
| 270760 ||  || — || September 5, 2002 || Socorro || LINEAR || ERI || align=right | 1.9 km || 
|-id=761 bgcolor=#d6d6d6
| 270761 ||  || — || September 6, 2002 || Socorro || LINEAR || — || align=right | 4.5 km || 
|-id=762 bgcolor=#fefefe
| 270762 ||  || — || September 3, 2002 || Palomar || NEAT || V || align=right data-sort-value="0.80" | 800 m || 
|-id=763 bgcolor=#d6d6d6
| 270763 ||  || — || September 10, 2002 || Haleakala || NEAT || EOS || align=right | 3.0 km || 
|-id=764 bgcolor=#d6d6d6
| 270764 ||  || — || September 11, 2002 || Haleakala || NEAT || LIX || align=right | 4.3 km || 
|-id=765 bgcolor=#d6d6d6
| 270765 ||  || — || September 11, 2002 || Haleakala || NEAT || — || align=right | 3.8 km || 
|-id=766 bgcolor=#fefefe
| 270766 ||  || — || September 10, 2002 || Haleakala || NEAT || FLO || align=right data-sort-value="0.60" | 600 m || 
|-id=767 bgcolor=#fefefe
| 270767 ||  || — || September 11, 2002 || Palomar || NEAT || — || align=right data-sort-value="0.89" | 890 m || 
|-id=768 bgcolor=#d6d6d6
| 270768 ||  || — || September 11, 2002 || Palomar || NEAT || THM || align=right | 3.1 km || 
|-id=769 bgcolor=#d6d6d6
| 270769 ||  || — || September 12, 2002 || Palomar || NEAT || — || align=right | 5.0 km || 
|-id=770 bgcolor=#fefefe
| 270770 ||  || — || September 12, 2002 || Palomar || NEAT || — || align=right | 1.2 km || 
|-id=771 bgcolor=#d6d6d6
| 270771 ||  || — || September 12, 2002 || Palomar || NEAT || LIX || align=right | 5.1 km || 
|-id=772 bgcolor=#fefefe
| 270772 ||  || — || September 11, 2002 || Palomar || NEAT || V || align=right data-sort-value="0.81" | 810 m || 
|-id=773 bgcolor=#d6d6d6
| 270773 ||  || — || September 12, 2002 || Palomar || NEAT || — || align=right | 3.8 km || 
|-id=774 bgcolor=#fefefe
| 270774 ||  || — || September 13, 2002 || Palomar || NEAT || — || align=right data-sort-value="0.90" | 900 m || 
|-id=775 bgcolor=#d6d6d6
| 270775 ||  || — || September 13, 2002 || Palomar || NEAT || — || align=right | 4.2 km || 
|-id=776 bgcolor=#d6d6d6
| 270776 ||  || — || September 13, 2002 || Palomar || NEAT || — || align=right | 4.0 km || 
|-id=777 bgcolor=#d6d6d6
| 270777 ||  || — || September 13, 2002 || Palomar || NEAT || HYG || align=right | 2.6 km || 
|-id=778 bgcolor=#d6d6d6
| 270778 ||  || — || September 12, 2002 || Palomar || NEAT || — || align=right | 5.2 km || 
|-id=779 bgcolor=#d6d6d6
| 270779 ||  || — || September 14, 2002 || Palomar || NEAT || EOS || align=right | 2.8 km || 
|-id=780 bgcolor=#fefefe
| 270780 ||  || — || September 12, 2002 || Haleakala || NEAT || V || align=right data-sort-value="0.88" | 880 m || 
|-id=781 bgcolor=#d6d6d6
| 270781 ||  || — || September 13, 2002 || Socorro || LINEAR || — || align=right | 3.4 km || 
|-id=782 bgcolor=#d6d6d6
| 270782 ||  || — || September 13, 2002 || Socorro || LINEAR || — || align=right | 4.5 km || 
|-id=783 bgcolor=#d6d6d6
| 270783 ||  || — || September 14, 2002 || Palomar || NEAT || URS || align=right | 5.3 km || 
|-id=784 bgcolor=#d6d6d6
| 270784 ||  || — || September 14, 2002 || Palomar || NEAT || — || align=right | 3.8 km || 
|-id=785 bgcolor=#d6d6d6
| 270785 ||  || — || September 11, 2002 || Haleakala || NEAT || — || align=right | 4.8 km || 
|-id=786 bgcolor=#d6d6d6
| 270786 ||  || — || September 14, 2002 || Haleakala || NEAT || — || align=right | 4.8 km || 
|-id=787 bgcolor=#d6d6d6
| 270787 ||  || — || September 15, 2002 || Palomar || NEAT || EOS || align=right | 5.2 km || 
|-id=788 bgcolor=#d6d6d6
| 270788 ||  || — || September 15, 2002 || Palomar || NEAT || — || align=right | 4.0 km || 
|-id=789 bgcolor=#d6d6d6
| 270789 ||  || — || September 15, 2002 || Palomar || NEAT || — || align=right | 3.4 km || 
|-id=790 bgcolor=#fefefe
| 270790 ||  || — || September 13, 2002 || Anderson Mesa || LONEOS || — || align=right | 1.0 km || 
|-id=791 bgcolor=#d6d6d6
| 270791 ||  || — || September 13, 2002 || Palomar || NEAT || HYG || align=right | 3.6 km || 
|-id=792 bgcolor=#fefefe
| 270792 ||  || — || September 13, 2002 || Palomar || NEAT || — || align=right | 1.1 km || 
|-id=793 bgcolor=#fefefe
| 270793 ||  || — || September 5, 2002 || Socorro || LINEAR || — || align=right | 1.1 km || 
|-id=794 bgcolor=#d6d6d6
| 270794 ||  || — || September 14, 2002 || Palomar || NEAT || — || align=right | 3.4 km || 
|-id=795 bgcolor=#d6d6d6
| 270795 ||  || — || September 14, 2002 || Palomar || NEAT || — || align=right | 5.2 km || 
|-id=796 bgcolor=#d6d6d6
| 270796 ||  || — || September 2, 2002 || Haleakala || S. F. Hönig || — || align=right | 3.7 km || 
|-id=797 bgcolor=#d6d6d6
| 270797 ||  || — || September 14, 2002 || Palomar || R. Matson || — || align=right | 4.4 km || 
|-id=798 bgcolor=#d6d6d6
| 270798 ||  || — || September 14, 2002 || Palomar || R. Matson || — || align=right | 6.0 km || 
|-id=799 bgcolor=#d6d6d6
| 270799 ||  || — || September 14, 2002 || Palomar || R. Matson || — || align=right | 3.4 km || 
|-id=800 bgcolor=#fefefe
| 270800 ||  || — || September 15, 2002 || Palomar || R. Matson || — || align=right data-sort-value="0.72" | 720 m || 
|}

270801–270900 

|-bgcolor=#d6d6d6
| 270801 ||  || — || September 10, 2002 || Palomar || NEAT || EUP || align=right | 4.1 km || 
|-id=802 bgcolor=#d6d6d6
| 270802 ||  || — || September 15, 2002 || Palomar || NEAT || — || align=right | 3.4 km || 
|-id=803 bgcolor=#d6d6d6
| 270803 ||  || — || September 14, 2002 || Palomar || NEAT || — || align=right | 3.1 km || 
|-id=804 bgcolor=#fefefe
| 270804 ||  || — || September 13, 2002 || Palomar || NEAT || — || align=right data-sort-value="0.91" | 910 m || 
|-id=805 bgcolor=#d6d6d6
| 270805 ||  || — || September 14, 2002 || Palomar || NEAT || — || align=right | 4.1 km || 
|-id=806 bgcolor=#fefefe
| 270806 ||  || — || September 14, 2002 || Palomar || NEAT || — || align=right data-sort-value="0.68" | 680 m || 
|-id=807 bgcolor=#d6d6d6
| 270807 ||  || — || September 14, 2002 || Haleakala || NEAT || — || align=right | 5.4 km || 
|-id=808 bgcolor=#fefefe
| 270808 ||  || — || September 13, 2002 || Palomar || NEAT || V || align=right data-sort-value="0.68" | 680 m || 
|-id=809 bgcolor=#fefefe
| 270809 ||  || — || September 15, 2002 || Palomar || NEAT || MAS || align=right data-sort-value="0.85" | 850 m || 
|-id=810 bgcolor=#d6d6d6
| 270810 ||  || — || September 14, 2002 || Palomar || NEAT || — || align=right | 4.3 km || 
|-id=811 bgcolor=#fefefe
| 270811 ||  || — || September 14, 2002 || Palomar || NEAT || — || align=right data-sort-value="0.93" | 930 m || 
|-id=812 bgcolor=#d6d6d6
| 270812 ||  || — || September 4, 2002 || Palomar || NEAT || EOS || align=right | 2.3 km || 
|-id=813 bgcolor=#fefefe
| 270813 ||  || — || September 4, 2002 || Palomar || NEAT || FLO || align=right data-sort-value="0.80" | 800 m || 
|-id=814 bgcolor=#d6d6d6
| 270814 ||  || — || September 4, 2002 || Palomar || NEAT || — || align=right | 2.8 km || 
|-id=815 bgcolor=#fefefe
| 270815 ||  || — || September 4, 2002 || Palomar || NEAT || MAS || align=right data-sort-value="0.63" | 630 m || 
|-id=816 bgcolor=#d6d6d6
| 270816 ||  || — || September 4, 2002 || Palomar || NEAT || THB || align=right | 4.5 km || 
|-id=817 bgcolor=#fefefe
| 270817 ||  || — || September 26, 2002 || Palomar || NEAT || — || align=right | 2.3 km || 
|-id=818 bgcolor=#d6d6d6
| 270818 ||  || — || September 26, 2002 || Palomar || NEAT || HYG || align=right | 3.9 km || 
|-id=819 bgcolor=#d6d6d6
| 270819 ||  || — || September 26, 2002 || Palomar || NEAT || URS || align=right | 4.0 km || 
|-id=820 bgcolor=#d6d6d6
| 270820 ||  || — || September 27, 2002 || Palomar || NEAT || Tj (2.96) || align=right | 5.5 km || 
|-id=821 bgcolor=#fefefe
| 270821 ||  || — || September 27, 2002 || Anderson Mesa || LONEOS || — || align=right | 1.4 km || 
|-id=822 bgcolor=#E9E9E9
| 270822 ||  || — || September 26, 2002 || Palomar || NEAT || — || align=right | 1.2 km || 
|-id=823 bgcolor=#d6d6d6
| 270823 ||  || — || September 26, 2002 || Palomar || NEAT || EOS || align=right | 4.7 km || 
|-id=824 bgcolor=#fefefe
| 270824 ||  || — || September 26, 2002 || Palomar || NEAT || FLO || align=right | 1.5 km || 
|-id=825 bgcolor=#d6d6d6
| 270825 ||  || — || September 26, 2002 || Palomar || NEAT || EUP || align=right | 4.3 km || 
|-id=826 bgcolor=#fefefe
| 270826 ||  || — || September 28, 2002 || Haleakala || NEAT || — || align=right | 2.4 km || 
|-id=827 bgcolor=#fefefe
| 270827 ||  || — || September 29, 2002 || Haleakala || NEAT || — || align=right data-sort-value="0.95" | 950 m || 
|-id=828 bgcolor=#fefefe
| 270828 ||  || — || September 29, 2002 || Haleakala || NEAT || — || align=right | 1.1 km || 
|-id=829 bgcolor=#d6d6d6
| 270829 ||  || — || September 30, 2002 || Ondřejov || P. Pravec || EOS || align=right | 2.6 km || 
|-id=830 bgcolor=#d6d6d6
| 270830 ||  || — || September 29, 2002 || Haleakala || NEAT || — || align=right | 4.8 km || 
|-id=831 bgcolor=#d6d6d6
| 270831 ||  || — || September 29, 2002 || Haleakala || NEAT || — || align=right | 5.2 km || 
|-id=832 bgcolor=#fefefe
| 270832 ||  || — || September 29, 2002 || Eskridge || Farpoint Obs. || FLO || align=right data-sort-value="0.93" | 930 m || 
|-id=833 bgcolor=#fefefe
| 270833 ||  || — || September 30, 2002 || Socorro || LINEAR || NYS || align=right data-sort-value="0.88" | 880 m || 
|-id=834 bgcolor=#fefefe
| 270834 ||  || — || September 16, 2002 || Palomar || NEAT || V || align=right data-sort-value="0.69" | 690 m || 
|-id=835 bgcolor=#fefefe
| 270835 ||  || — || September 26, 2002 || Palomar || NEAT || MAS || align=right data-sort-value="0.65" | 650 m || 
|-id=836 bgcolor=#d6d6d6
| 270836 ||  || — || September 26, 2002 || Palomar || NEAT || EOS || align=right | 2.3 km || 
|-id=837 bgcolor=#d6d6d6
| 270837 ||  || — || September 16, 2002 || Palomar || NEAT || — || align=right | 3.8 km || 
|-id=838 bgcolor=#fefefe
| 270838 ||  || — || October 1, 2002 || Anderson Mesa || LONEOS || — || align=right | 1.3 km || 
|-id=839 bgcolor=#fefefe
| 270839 ||  || — || October 1, 2002 || Anderson Mesa || LONEOS || — || align=right | 1.1 km || 
|-id=840 bgcolor=#d6d6d6
| 270840 ||  || — || October 1, 2002 || Anderson Mesa || LONEOS || — || align=right | 6.1 km || 
|-id=841 bgcolor=#fefefe
| 270841 ||  || — || October 1, 2002 || Anderson Mesa || LONEOS || NYS || align=right data-sort-value="0.92" | 920 m || 
|-id=842 bgcolor=#fefefe
| 270842 ||  || — || October 1, 2002 || Anderson Mesa || LONEOS || — || align=right data-sort-value="0.91" | 910 m || 
|-id=843 bgcolor=#fefefe
| 270843 ||  || — || October 2, 2002 || Socorro || LINEAR || NYS || align=right data-sort-value="0.88" | 880 m || 
|-id=844 bgcolor=#d6d6d6
| 270844 ||  || — || October 2, 2002 || Socorro || LINEAR || — || align=right | 5.5 km || 
|-id=845 bgcolor=#d6d6d6
| 270845 ||  || — || October 2, 2002 || Socorro || LINEAR || — || align=right | 3.7 km || 
|-id=846 bgcolor=#d6d6d6
| 270846 ||  || — || October 2, 2002 || Socorro || LINEAR || — || align=right | 3.4 km || 
|-id=847 bgcolor=#fefefe
| 270847 ||  || — || October 2, 2002 || Socorro || LINEAR || MAS || align=right data-sort-value="0.88" | 880 m || 
|-id=848 bgcolor=#fefefe
| 270848 ||  || — || October 2, 2002 || Socorro || LINEAR || PHO || align=right | 2.5 km || 
|-id=849 bgcolor=#fefefe
| 270849 ||  || — || October 2, 2002 || Socorro || LINEAR || NYS || align=right data-sort-value="0.88" | 880 m || 
|-id=850 bgcolor=#d6d6d6
| 270850 ||  || — || October 2, 2002 || Socorro || LINEAR || — || align=right | 4.0 km || 
|-id=851 bgcolor=#d6d6d6
| 270851 ||  || — || October 2, 2002 || Socorro || LINEAR || HYG || align=right | 3.8 km || 
|-id=852 bgcolor=#E9E9E9
| 270852 ||  || — || October 2, 2002 || Socorro || LINEAR || — || align=right | 1.2 km || 
|-id=853 bgcolor=#fefefe
| 270853 ||  || — || October 2, 2002 || Socorro || LINEAR || FLO || align=right data-sort-value="0.84" | 840 m || 
|-id=854 bgcolor=#FA8072
| 270854 ||  || — || October 2, 2002 || Socorro || LINEAR || — || align=right data-sort-value="0.95" | 950 m || 
|-id=855 bgcolor=#fefefe
| 270855 ||  || — || October 2, 2002 || Socorro || LINEAR || V || align=right data-sort-value="0.91" | 910 m || 
|-id=856 bgcolor=#d6d6d6
| 270856 ||  || — || October 2, 2002 || Socorro || LINEAR || — || align=right | 6.0 km || 
|-id=857 bgcolor=#fefefe
| 270857 ||  || — || October 4, 2002 || Socorro || LINEAR || FLO || align=right data-sort-value="0.73" | 730 m || 
|-id=858 bgcolor=#E9E9E9
| 270858 ||  || — || October 11, 2002 || Dominion || J. L. Clem || — || align=right | 1.8 km || 
|-id=859 bgcolor=#fefefe
| 270859 ||  || — || October 1, 2002 || Anderson Mesa || LONEOS || FLO || align=right data-sort-value="0.92" | 920 m || 
|-id=860 bgcolor=#fefefe
| 270860 ||  || — || October 1, 2002 || Anderson Mesa || LONEOS || — || align=right | 1.2 km || 
|-id=861 bgcolor=#d6d6d6
| 270861 ||  || — || October 1, 2002 || Anderson Mesa || LONEOS || — || align=right | 5.0 km || 
|-id=862 bgcolor=#d6d6d6
| 270862 ||  || — || October 1, 2002 || Anderson Mesa || LONEOS || — || align=right | 4.4 km || 
|-id=863 bgcolor=#fefefe
| 270863 ||  || — || October 2, 2002 || Campo Imperatore || CINEOS || — || align=right | 1.3 km || 
|-id=864 bgcolor=#d6d6d6
| 270864 ||  || — || October 3, 2002 || Palomar || NEAT || — || align=right | 6.7 km || 
|-id=865 bgcolor=#fefefe
| 270865 ||  || — || October 3, 2002 || Socorro || LINEAR || — || align=right data-sort-value="0.85" | 850 m || 
|-id=866 bgcolor=#d6d6d6
| 270866 ||  || — || October 2, 2002 || Socorro || LINEAR || HYG || align=right | 3.9 km || 
|-id=867 bgcolor=#d6d6d6
| 270867 ||  || — || October 2, 2002 || Socorro || LINEAR || EOS || align=right | 2.9 km || 
|-id=868 bgcolor=#fefefe
| 270868 ||  || — || October 3, 2002 || Socorro || LINEAR || V || align=right data-sort-value="0.66" | 660 m || 
|-id=869 bgcolor=#d6d6d6
| 270869 ||  || — || October 3, 2002 || Campo Imperatore || CINEOS || — || align=right | 3.9 km || 
|-id=870 bgcolor=#d6d6d6
| 270870 ||  || — || October 4, 2002 || Palomar || NEAT || — || align=right | 5.4 km || 
|-id=871 bgcolor=#fefefe
| 270871 ||  || — || October 4, 2002 || Palomar || NEAT || — || align=right data-sort-value="0.98" | 980 m || 
|-id=872 bgcolor=#d6d6d6
| 270872 ||  || — || October 4, 2002 || Palomar || NEAT || — || align=right | 5.2 km || 
|-id=873 bgcolor=#fefefe
| 270873 ||  || — || October 4, 2002 || Socorro || LINEAR || — || align=right data-sort-value="0.91" | 910 m || 
|-id=874 bgcolor=#d6d6d6
| 270874 ||  || — || October 4, 2002 || Palomar || NEAT || — || align=right | 5.2 km || 
|-id=875 bgcolor=#d6d6d6
| 270875 ||  || — || October 5, 2002 || Palomar || NEAT || 3:2 || align=right | 6.3 km || 
|-id=876 bgcolor=#d6d6d6
| 270876 ||  || — || October 5, 2002 || Palomar || NEAT || EOS || align=right | 2.7 km || 
|-id=877 bgcolor=#d6d6d6
| 270877 ||  || — || October 4, 2002 || Socorro || LINEAR || — || align=right | 4.4 km || 
|-id=878 bgcolor=#fefefe
| 270878 ||  || — || October 4, 2002 || Socorro || LINEAR || — || align=right | 1.0 km || 
|-id=879 bgcolor=#fefefe
| 270879 ||  || — || October 4, 2002 || Socorro || LINEAR || — || align=right | 1.0 km || 
|-id=880 bgcolor=#fefefe
| 270880 ||  || — || October 6, 2002 || Socorro || LINEAR || — || align=right | 1.1 km || 
|-id=881 bgcolor=#d6d6d6
| 270881 ||  || — || October 3, 2002 || Socorro || LINEAR || HYG || align=right | 4.2 km || 
|-id=882 bgcolor=#fefefe
| 270882 ||  || — || October 3, 2002 || Socorro || LINEAR || — || align=right data-sort-value="0.98" | 980 m || 
|-id=883 bgcolor=#fefefe
| 270883 ||  || — || October 4, 2002 || Socorro || LINEAR || — || align=right | 1.2 km || 
|-id=884 bgcolor=#d6d6d6
| 270884 ||  || — || October 5, 2002 || Socorro || LINEAR || — || align=right | 5.1 km || 
|-id=885 bgcolor=#fefefe
| 270885 ||  || — || October 7, 2002 || Anderson Mesa || LONEOS || FLO || align=right | 1.0 km || 
|-id=886 bgcolor=#d6d6d6
| 270886 ||  || — || October 6, 2002 || Haleakala || NEAT || — || align=right | 4.7 km || 
|-id=887 bgcolor=#fefefe
| 270887 ||  || — || October 7, 2002 || Socorro || LINEAR || NYS || align=right data-sort-value="0.97" | 970 m || 
|-id=888 bgcolor=#fefefe
| 270888 ||  || — || October 3, 2002 || Campo Imperatore || CINEOS || FLO || align=right data-sort-value="0.85" | 850 m || 
|-id=889 bgcolor=#fefefe
| 270889 ||  || — || October 8, 2002 || Anderson Mesa || LONEOS || — || align=right | 1.1 km || 
|-id=890 bgcolor=#d6d6d6
| 270890 ||  || — || October 9, 2002 || Kitt Peak || Spacewatch || THM || align=right | 2.5 km || 
|-id=891 bgcolor=#E9E9E9
| 270891 ||  || — || October 6, 2002 || Socorro || LINEAR || — || align=right | 3.7 km || 
|-id=892 bgcolor=#fefefe
| 270892 ||  || — || October 9, 2002 || Anderson Mesa || LONEOS || — || align=right | 1.5 km || 
|-id=893 bgcolor=#FA8072
| 270893 ||  || — || October 7, 2002 || Haleakala || NEAT || — || align=right data-sort-value="0.82" | 820 m || 
|-id=894 bgcolor=#fefefe
| 270894 ||  || — || October 7, 2002 || Socorro || LINEAR || — || align=right | 1.0 km || 
|-id=895 bgcolor=#fefefe
| 270895 ||  || — || October 8, 2002 || Anderson Mesa || LONEOS || — || align=right | 1.0 km || 
|-id=896 bgcolor=#d6d6d6
| 270896 ||  || — || October 9, 2002 || Socorro || LINEAR || — || align=right | 5.2 km || 
|-id=897 bgcolor=#d6d6d6
| 270897 ||  || — || October 8, 2002 || Anderson Mesa || LONEOS || — || align=right | 4.3 km || 
|-id=898 bgcolor=#d6d6d6
| 270898 ||  || — || October 9, 2002 || Socorro || LINEAR || LIX || align=right | 4.7 km || 
|-id=899 bgcolor=#fefefe
| 270899 ||  || — || October 9, 2002 || Socorro || LINEAR || FLO || align=right data-sort-value="0.87" | 870 m || 
|-id=900 bgcolor=#fefefe
| 270900 ||  || — || October 9, 2002 || Socorro || LINEAR || V || align=right data-sort-value="0.73" | 730 m || 
|}

270901–271000 

|-bgcolor=#fefefe
| 270901 ||  || — || October 9, 2002 || Socorro || LINEAR || — || align=right | 1.3 km || 
|-id=902 bgcolor=#d6d6d6
| 270902 ||  || — || October 11, 2002 || Socorro || LINEAR || — || align=right | 4.5 km || 
|-id=903 bgcolor=#d6d6d6
| 270903 Pakstiene ||  ||  || October 5, 2002 || Palomar || K. Černis || — || align=right | 3.4 km || 
|-id=904 bgcolor=#d6d6d6
| 270904 ||  || — || October 4, 2002 || Apache Point || SDSS || HYG || align=right | 3.5 km || 
|-id=905 bgcolor=#fefefe
| 270905 ||  || — || October 4, 2002 || Apache Point || SDSS || — || align=right | 1.1 km || 
|-id=906 bgcolor=#d6d6d6
| 270906 ||  || — || October 4, 2002 || Apache Point || SDSS || EOS || align=right | 2.8 km || 
|-id=907 bgcolor=#fefefe
| 270907 ||  || — || October 5, 2002 || Apache Point || SDSS || — || align=right data-sort-value="0.90" | 900 m || 
|-id=908 bgcolor=#d6d6d6
| 270908 ||  || — || October 5, 2002 || Apache Point || SDSS || — || align=right | 2.7 km || 
|-id=909 bgcolor=#fefefe
| 270909 ||  || — || October 5, 2002 || Apache Point || SDSS || V || align=right data-sort-value="0.79" | 790 m || 
|-id=910 bgcolor=#d6d6d6
| 270910 ||  || — || October 5, 2002 || Apache Point || SDSS || — || align=right | 3.6 km || 
|-id=911 bgcolor=#d6d6d6
| 270911 ||  || — || October 10, 2002 || Apache Point || SDSS || — || align=right | 3.4 km || 
|-id=912 bgcolor=#d6d6d6
| 270912 ||  || — || October 10, 2002 || Apache Point || SDSS || EOS || align=right | 2.4 km || 
|-id=913 bgcolor=#d6d6d6
| 270913 ||  || — || October 10, 2002 || Apache Point || SDSS || VER || align=right | 4.4 km || 
|-id=914 bgcolor=#d6d6d6
| 270914 ||  || — || October 9, 2002 || Palomar || NEAT || — || align=right | 4.0 km || 
|-id=915 bgcolor=#d6d6d6
| 270915 ||  || — || October 15, 2002 || Palomar || NEAT || — || align=right | 3.3 km || 
|-id=916 bgcolor=#d6d6d6
| 270916 ||  || — || October 3, 2002 || Palomar || NEAT || EOS || align=right | 3.2 km || 
|-id=917 bgcolor=#d6d6d6
| 270917 ||  || — || October 5, 2002 || Palomar || NEAT || — || align=right | 2.8 km || 
|-id=918 bgcolor=#d6d6d6
| 270918 ||  || — || October 5, 2002 || Apache Point || SDSS || — || align=right | 4.3 km || 
|-id=919 bgcolor=#fefefe
| 270919 ||  || — || October 5, 2002 || Apache Point || SDSS || V || align=right data-sort-value="0.76" | 760 m || 
|-id=920 bgcolor=#fefefe
| 270920 || 2002 UT || — || October 25, 2002 || Wrightwood || J. W. Young || — || align=right | 1.2 km || 
|-id=921 bgcolor=#d6d6d6
| 270921 ||  || — || October 28, 2002 || Palomar || NEAT || — || align=right | 3.1 km || 
|-id=922 bgcolor=#d6d6d6
| 270922 ||  || — || October 28, 2002 || Haleakala || NEAT || — || align=right | 5.2 km || 
|-id=923 bgcolor=#d6d6d6
| 270923 ||  || — || October 30, 2002 || Palomar || NEAT || — || align=right | 5.7 km || 
|-id=924 bgcolor=#d6d6d6
| 270924 ||  || — || October 30, 2002 || Palomar || NEAT || — || align=right | 5.5 km || 
|-id=925 bgcolor=#fefefe
| 270925 ||  || — || October 30, 2002 || Palomar || NEAT || — || align=right data-sort-value="0.97" | 970 m || 
|-id=926 bgcolor=#fefefe
| 270926 ||  || — || October 30, 2002 || Kitt Peak || Spacewatch || — || align=right data-sort-value="0.88" | 880 m || 
|-id=927 bgcolor=#d6d6d6
| 270927 ||  || — || October 30, 2002 || Haleakala || NEAT || — || align=right | 4.6 km || 
|-id=928 bgcolor=#fefefe
| 270928 ||  || — || October 31, 2002 || Palomar || NEAT || — || align=right data-sort-value="0.94" | 940 m || 
|-id=929 bgcolor=#d6d6d6
| 270929 ||  || — || October 31, 2002 || Palomar || NEAT || — || align=right | 3.6 km || 
|-id=930 bgcolor=#d6d6d6
| 270930 ||  || — || October 30, 2002 || Kitt Peak || Spacewatch || THM || align=right | 3.1 km || 
|-id=931 bgcolor=#d6d6d6
| 270931 ||  || — || October 29, 2002 || Apache Point || SDSS || EOS || align=right | 3.0 km || 
|-id=932 bgcolor=#fefefe
| 270932 ||  || — || October 29, 2002 || Apache Point || SDSS || — || align=right | 1.1 km || 
|-id=933 bgcolor=#d6d6d6
| 270933 ||  || — || October 29, 2002 || Apache Point || SDSS || — || align=right | 2.9 km || 
|-id=934 bgcolor=#d6d6d6
| 270934 ||  || — || October 30, 2002 || Apache Point || SDSS || THB || align=right | 4.9 km || 
|-id=935 bgcolor=#d6d6d6
| 270935 ||  || — || October 30, 2002 || Apache Point || SDSS || — || align=right | 3.8 km || 
|-id=936 bgcolor=#fefefe
| 270936 ||  || — || October 30, 2002 || Palomar || NEAT || FLO || align=right data-sort-value="0.68" | 680 m || 
|-id=937 bgcolor=#fefefe
| 270937 ||  || — || October 30, 2002 || Apache Point || SDSS || V || align=right data-sort-value="0.80" | 800 m || 
|-id=938 bgcolor=#fefefe
| 270938 ||  || — || October 30, 2002 || Apache Point || SDSS || — || align=right | 2.0 km || 
|-id=939 bgcolor=#d6d6d6
| 270939 ||  || — || October 29, 2002 || Palomar || NEAT || — || align=right | 7.5 km || 
|-id=940 bgcolor=#fefefe
| 270940 ||  || — || November 4, 2002 || Palomar || NEAT || — || align=right | 1.5 km || 
|-id=941 bgcolor=#fefefe
| 270941 ||  || — || November 2, 2002 || La Palma || La Palma Obs. || — || align=right data-sort-value="0.81" | 810 m || 
|-id=942 bgcolor=#fefefe
| 270942 ||  || — || November 5, 2002 || Socorro || LINEAR || — || align=right | 1.2 km || 
|-id=943 bgcolor=#fefefe
| 270943 ||  || — || November 4, 2002 || Anderson Mesa || LONEOS || MAS || align=right data-sort-value="0.88" | 880 m || 
|-id=944 bgcolor=#fefefe
| 270944 ||  || — || November 5, 2002 || Socorro || LINEAR || — || align=right | 1.5 km || 
|-id=945 bgcolor=#fefefe
| 270945 ||  || — || November 5, 2002 || Socorro || LINEAR || ERI || align=right | 2.1 km || 
|-id=946 bgcolor=#fefefe
| 270946 ||  || — || November 5, 2002 || Palomar || NEAT || MAS || align=right data-sort-value="0.74" | 740 m || 
|-id=947 bgcolor=#fefefe
| 270947 ||  || — || November 4, 2002 || Haleakala || NEAT || — || align=right data-sort-value="0.90" | 900 m || 
|-id=948 bgcolor=#fefefe
| 270948 ||  || — || November 5, 2002 || Socorro || LINEAR || MAS || align=right data-sort-value="0.76" | 760 m || 
|-id=949 bgcolor=#d6d6d6
| 270949 ||  || — || November 6, 2002 || Anderson Mesa || LONEOS || — || align=right | 3.2 km || 
|-id=950 bgcolor=#fefefe
| 270950 ||  || — || November 6, 2002 || Socorro || LINEAR || V || align=right data-sort-value="0.72" | 720 m || 
|-id=951 bgcolor=#fefefe
| 270951 ||  || — || November 6, 2002 || Anderson Mesa || LONEOS || — || align=right | 1.1 km || 
|-id=952 bgcolor=#fefefe
| 270952 ||  || — || November 5, 2002 || Socorro || LINEAR || — || align=right data-sort-value="0.99" | 990 m || 
|-id=953 bgcolor=#fefefe
| 270953 ||  || — || November 6, 2002 || Socorro || LINEAR || FLO || align=right data-sort-value="0.88" | 880 m || 
|-id=954 bgcolor=#d6d6d6
| 270954 ||  || — || November 6, 2002 || Anderson Mesa || LONEOS || — || align=right | 5.0 km || 
|-id=955 bgcolor=#d6d6d6
| 270955 ||  || — || November 7, 2002 || Socorro || LINEAR || EOS || align=right | 3.0 km || 
|-id=956 bgcolor=#fefefe
| 270956 ||  || — || November 7, 2002 || Socorro || LINEAR || FLO || align=right data-sort-value="0.91" | 910 m || 
|-id=957 bgcolor=#fefefe
| 270957 ||  || — || November 7, 2002 || Socorro || LINEAR || V || align=right data-sort-value="0.78" | 780 m || 
|-id=958 bgcolor=#fefefe
| 270958 ||  || — || November 7, 2002 || Socorro || LINEAR || NYS || align=right data-sort-value="0.87" | 870 m || 
|-id=959 bgcolor=#E9E9E9
| 270959 ||  || — || November 7, 2002 || Socorro || LINEAR || HNS || align=right | 2.4 km || 
|-id=960 bgcolor=#fefefe
| 270960 ||  || — || November 7, 2002 || Socorro || LINEAR || NYS || align=right data-sort-value="0.87" | 870 m || 
|-id=961 bgcolor=#d6d6d6
| 270961 ||  || — || November 8, 2002 || Socorro || LINEAR || — || align=right | 3.8 km || 
|-id=962 bgcolor=#fefefe
| 270962 ||  || — || November 11, 2002 || Socorro || LINEAR || NYS || align=right | 1.7 km || 
|-id=963 bgcolor=#fefefe
| 270963 ||  || — || November 11, 2002 || Socorro || LINEAR || — || align=right | 1.1 km || 
|-id=964 bgcolor=#fefefe
| 270964 ||  || — || November 12, 2002 || Anderson Mesa || LONEOS || — || align=right | 1.2 km || 
|-id=965 bgcolor=#fefefe
| 270965 ||  || — || November 12, 2002 || Socorro || LINEAR || V || align=right data-sort-value="0.82" | 820 m || 
|-id=966 bgcolor=#fefefe
| 270966 ||  || — || November 11, 2002 || Anderson Mesa || LONEOS || — || align=right | 1.2 km || 
|-id=967 bgcolor=#fefefe
| 270967 ||  || — || November 11, 2002 || Socorro || LINEAR || — || align=right | 1.3 km || 
|-id=968 bgcolor=#fefefe
| 270968 ||  || — || November 12, 2002 || Socorro || LINEAR || NYS || align=right data-sort-value="0.78" | 780 m || 
|-id=969 bgcolor=#d6d6d6
| 270969 ||  || — || November 12, 2002 || Socorro || LINEAR || — || align=right | 4.6 km || 
|-id=970 bgcolor=#fefefe
| 270970 ||  || — || November 12, 2002 || Socorro || LINEAR || FLO || align=right | 1.1 km || 
|-id=971 bgcolor=#fefefe
| 270971 ||  || — || November 12, 2002 || Socorro || LINEAR || V || align=right data-sort-value="0.74" | 740 m || 
|-id=972 bgcolor=#E9E9E9
| 270972 ||  || — || November 12, 2002 || Socorro || LINEAR || RAF || align=right | 1.0 km || 
|-id=973 bgcolor=#d6d6d6
| 270973 ||  || — || November 12, 2002 || Palomar || NEAT || — || align=right | 4.5 km || 
|-id=974 bgcolor=#fefefe
| 270974 ||  || — || November 5, 2002 || Socorro || LINEAR || — || align=right | 2.1 km || 
|-id=975 bgcolor=#fefefe
| 270975 ||  || — || November 6, 2002 || Anderson Mesa || LONEOS || — || align=right data-sort-value="0.98" | 980 m || 
|-id=976 bgcolor=#fefefe
| 270976 ||  || — || November 12, 2002 || Palomar || NEAT || MAS || align=right data-sort-value="0.73" | 730 m || 
|-id=977 bgcolor=#d6d6d6
| 270977 ||  || — || November 13, 2002 || Palomar || NEAT || — || align=right | 5.0 km || 
|-id=978 bgcolor=#d6d6d6
| 270978 ||  || — || November 4, 2002 || Palomar || NEAT || THM || align=right | 3.4 km || 
|-id=979 bgcolor=#fefefe
| 270979 ||  || — || November 11, 2002 || Palomar || NEAT || NYS || align=right data-sort-value="0.89" | 890 m || 
|-id=980 bgcolor=#fefefe
| 270980 ||  || — || November 25, 2002 || Emerald Lane || L. Ball || NYS || align=right data-sort-value="0.80" | 800 m || 
|-id=981 bgcolor=#fefefe
| 270981 ||  || — || November 28, 2002 || Eskridge || G. Hug || V || align=right data-sort-value="0.76" | 760 m || 
|-id=982 bgcolor=#fefefe
| 270982 ||  || — || November 25, 2002 || Palomar || S. F. Hönig || — || align=right data-sort-value="0.95" | 950 m || 
|-id=983 bgcolor=#fefefe
| 270983 ||  || — || November 24, 2002 || Palomar || NEAT || — || align=right data-sort-value="0.83" | 830 m || 
|-id=984 bgcolor=#fefefe
| 270984 ||  || — || November 24, 2002 || Palomar || NEAT || NYS || align=right data-sort-value="0.59" | 590 m || 
|-id=985 bgcolor=#fefefe
| 270985 ||  || — || November 22, 2002 || Palomar || NEAT || FLO || align=right data-sort-value="0.74" | 740 m || 
|-id=986 bgcolor=#fefefe
| 270986 ||  || — || December 1, 2002 || Socorro || LINEAR || H || align=right data-sort-value="0.92" | 920 m || 
|-id=987 bgcolor=#fefefe
| 270987 ||  || — || December 1, 2002 || Haleakala || NEAT || — || align=right | 1.6 km || 
|-id=988 bgcolor=#d6d6d6
| 270988 ||  || — || December 3, 2002 || Palomar || NEAT || — || align=right | 4.1 km || 
|-id=989 bgcolor=#fefefe
| 270989 ||  || — || December 5, 2002 || Socorro || LINEAR || MAS || align=right data-sort-value="0.89" | 890 m || 
|-id=990 bgcolor=#fefefe
| 270990 ||  || — || December 3, 2002 || Palomar || NEAT || — || align=right | 1.1 km || 
|-id=991 bgcolor=#fefefe
| 270991 ||  || — || December 5, 2002 || Socorro || LINEAR || V || align=right data-sort-value="0.87" | 870 m || 
|-id=992 bgcolor=#fefefe
| 270992 ||  || — || December 5, 2002 || Socorro || LINEAR || — || align=right | 1.4 km || 
|-id=993 bgcolor=#E9E9E9
| 270993 ||  || — || December 6, 2002 || Socorro || LINEAR || — || align=right | 1.4 km || 
|-id=994 bgcolor=#fefefe
| 270994 ||  || — || December 9, 2002 || Uccle || T. Pauwels || MAS || align=right data-sort-value="0.90" | 900 m || 
|-id=995 bgcolor=#fefefe
| 270995 ||  || — || December 10, 2002 || Socorro || LINEAR || H || align=right data-sort-value="0.70" | 700 m || 
|-id=996 bgcolor=#fefefe
| 270996 ||  || — || December 11, 2002 || Socorro || LINEAR || NYS || align=right data-sort-value="0.93" | 930 m || 
|-id=997 bgcolor=#fefefe
| 270997 ||  || — || December 10, 2002 || Socorro || LINEAR || NYS || align=right | 2.5 km || 
|-id=998 bgcolor=#fefefe
| 270998 ||  || — || December 11, 2002 || Socorro || LINEAR || H || align=right data-sort-value="0.85" | 850 m || 
|-id=999 bgcolor=#d6d6d6
| 270999 ||  || — || December 12, 2002 || Socorro || LINEAR || Tj (2.99) || align=right | 5.0 km || 
|-id=000 bgcolor=#E9E9E9
| 271000 ||  || — || December 11, 2002 || Socorro || LINEAR || — || align=right | 2.2 km || 
|}

References

External links 
 Discovery Circumstances: Numbered Minor Planets (270001)–(275000) (IAU Minor Planet Center)

0270